= List of decathlon national champions (men) =

Below a list of all national champions in the Men's Decathlon event in track and field from several countries since 1980.

== Australia ==
- 1980: Peter Hadfield
- 1981: Peter Hadfield
- 1982: Peter Hadfield
- 1983: Peter Hadfield
- 1984: Peter Hadfield
- 1985: Peter Hadfield
- 1986: Simon Shirley
- 1987: Stuart Andrews
- 1988: Simon Shirley
- 1989: Chris Bradshaw
- 1990: Paul Scott
- 1991: Paul Scott
- 1992: Dean Smith
- 1993: Peter Winter
- 1994: Dean Smith
- 1995: Leslie Kuorikoski
- 1996: Peter Winter
- 1997: Peter Banks
- 1998: Jagan Hames
- 1999: Scott Ferrier
- 2000: Klaus Ambrosch (AUT)
- 2001: Matthew McEwen
- 2002: Scott Ferrier
- 2003: Matthew McEwen
- 2004: Matthew McEwen
- 2005: Eric Surjan
- 2006: Jason Dudley
- 2007: Eric Surjan
- 2008: Jason Dudley
- 2009: Brent Newdick (NZL)
- 2010: Stephen Cain
- 2011: Jarrod Sims
- 2012: Jarrod Sims
- 2013: Kyle McCarthy
- 2014: Jake Stein
- 2015: David Brock
- 2016: Cedric Dubler
- 2017: Cedric Dubler
- 2018: Cedric Dubler
- 2019: Daniel Golubovic (USA)

== Austria ==
- 1980: Georg Werthner
- 1981: Sepp Zeilbauer
- 1982: Georg Werthner
- 1983: Wolfgang Spann
- 1984: Georg Werthner
- 1985: Jürgen Mandl
- 1986: Georg Werthner
- 1987: Michael Arnold
- 1988: Georg Werthner
- 1989: Gernot Kellermayr
- 1990: Michael Arnold
- 1991: Erwin Reiterer
- 1992: Martin Krenn
- 1993: Leonard Hudec
- 1994: Leonard Hudec
- 1995: Gerhard Röser
- 1996: Thomas Tebbich
- 1997: Thomas Tebbich
- 1998: Klaus Ambrosch
- 1999: Klaus Ambrosch
- 2000: Thomas Lorber
- 2001: Markus Walser
- 2002: Klaus Ambrosch
- 2003: Roland Schwarzl
- 2004: Thomas Tebbich
- 2005: Markus Walser
- 2006: Johannes Künz
- 2007: Markus Walser
- 2008: Fabian Mayrhofer
- 2009: Dominik Distelberger

== Belgium ==
- 1980: Piet Van Vaerenbergh
- 1981: Roland Marloye
- 1982: Piet Van Vaerenbergh
- 1983: Piet Van Vaerenbergh
- 1984: Roland Marloye
- 1985: Roland Marloye
- 1986: Roland Marloye
- 1987: Erwin Van Nieuwenhove
- 1988: Roland Marloye
- 1989: Erwin Van Nieuwenhove
- 1990: Vincent Verleye
- 1991: Vincent Verleye
- 1992: Bert Van Opstel
- 1993: Vincent Verleye
- 1994: Raf Coomans
- 1995: Serge De Smet
- 1996: Serge De Smet
- 1997: Wim Van Meerbeeck
- 1998: Raf Coomans
- 1999: Serge De Smet
- 2000: Steve De Baer
- 2001: Serge De Smet
- 2002: Frank Vandaele
- 2003: Frédéric Xhonneux
- 2004: François Gourmet
- 2005: Hans Van Alphen
- 2006: Frédéric Xhonneux
- 2007: Frédéric Xhonneux
- 2008: Denis Goossens
- 2009: Bruno Carton-Delcourt
- 2010: Thomas Van Der Plaetsen
- 2011: Frédéric Xhonneux
- 2012: Bruno Carton-Delcourt
- 2013: Frédéric Xhonneux

== Bulgaria ==
- 1980: Razvigor Yankov
- 1981: Atanas Andonov
- 1982: Tsetsko Mitrakiev
- 1983: Tsetsko Mitrakiev
- 1984: Tsetsko Mitrakiev
- 1985: Tsetsko Mitrakiev
- 1986: Tsetsko Mitrakiev
- 1987: Tsetsko Mitrakiev
- 1988: Borislav Kolev
- 1989: Georgi Arnaoudov
- 1990: Asen Aleksandrov
- 1991: Georgi Arnaoudov
- 1992: Krasimir Petlichki
- 1993: Krasimir Petlichki
- 1994: Krasimir Petlichki
- 1995: Krasimir Petlichki
- 1996: Georgi Petrov
- 1997: Dimitar Georgiev
- 1998: Boris Vodenizharov
- 1999: Vladislav Iliev
- 2000: Marin Karailiev
- 2001: Miroslav Shishkov
- 2002: Angel Kararadev
- 2003: Kaloyan Kirov
- 2004: Kiril Osev
- 2005: Borislav Borisov
- 2006: Borislav Borisov

== Canada ==
- 1980: Steve Kemp
- 1981: Rob Town
- 1982: Dave Steen
- 1983: Milan Popadich
- 1984: Milan Popadich
- 1985: Greg Haydenluck
- 1986: Dave Steen
- 1987: Greg Haydenluck
- 1988: Richard Hesketh
- 1989: Mike Smith
- 1990: Mike Smith
- 1991: Garth Peet
- 1992: Garth Peet
- 1993: David Cook
- 1994: Mike Smith
- 1995: Mike Smith
- 1996: Matt Jeffrey
- 1997: Antonie Scholtz
- 1998: Dave Stewart
- 1999: Mike Nolan
- 2000: Mike Nolan
- 2001: Mike Nolan
- 2002: Mike Nolan
- 2003: Mike Nolan
- 2004: Josef Karas
- 2005: James Holder
- 2006: Massimo Bertocchi
- 2007: Massimo Bertocchi
- 2008: Massimo Bertocchi
- 2009: Reid Gustavson
- 2010: Jamie Adjetey Nelson
- 2011: Damian Warner
- 2012: Damian Warner

== Cuba ==
- 1986: Ernesto Betancourt
- 1987: Miguel Valle
- 1988: Luis Milanes
- 1989: Unknown
- 1990: Luis Milanes
- 1991: Eugenio Balanqué
- 1992: Ernesto Betancourt
- 1993: Eugenio Balanqué
- 1994: Eugenio Balanqué
- 1995: Raúl Duany
- 1996: Raúl Duany
- 1997: Jorge Moreno
- 1998: Yonelvis Águila
- 1999: Yonelvis Águila
- 2000: Raúl Duany
- 2001: Yonelvis Águila
- 2002: Yonelvis Águila
- 2003: Yonelvis Águila
- 2004: Alberto Juantorena Jr.
- 2005: Alexis Chivás
- 2006: Yordanis García

== Czechoslovakia ==
- 1980: Jirí Knejp
- 1981: Petr Šárec
- 1982: Martin Machura
- 1983: Martin Machura
- 1984: Martin Machura
- 1985: Martin Machura
- 1986: Roman Hraban
- 1987: Veroslav Valenta
- 1988: Petr Horn
- 1989: Lubomír Matoušek
- 1990: Veroslav Valenta
- 1991: Petr Horn
- 1992: Kamil Damašek

== Czech Republic ==
- 1993: Kamil Damašek
- 1994: Kamil Damašek
- 1995: Kamil Damašek
- 1996: Roman Šebrle
- 1997: Kamil Damašek
- 1998: Aleš Paštrnák
- 1999: Tomáš Komenda
- 2000: Aleš Paštrnák
- 2001: Pavel Havlícek
- 2002: Jan Podebradský
- 2003: Vít Zákoucký
- 2004: Jan Podebradský
- 2005: Josef Karas
- 2006: Josef Karas

== Denmark ==
- 1984: Mikkel Sørensen
- 1985: Morten Blumensaat
- 1986: Lars Warming
- 1987: Lars Warming
- 1988: Lars Warming
- 1989: Lars Warming
- 1990: Poul Gundersen
- 1991: Lars Warming
- 1992: Lars Warming
- 1993: Poul Gundersen
- 1994: Carsten Bomme
- 1995: Søren Johansson
- 1996: Thor Rasmussen
- 1997: Niels Uth
- 1998: Poul Gundersen
- 1999: Anders Black
- 2000: Piotr Buciarski
- 2001: Niels Uth
- 2002: Piotr Buciarski
- 2003: Anders Black
- 2004: Anders Black
- 2005: Anders Black
- 2006: Niels Uth
- 2007: Niels Uth

== Estonia ==
- 1920: Aleksander Klumberg
- 1921: -
- 1922: Eugen Neumann
- 1923: Heinrich Paal
- 1924: Aleksander Klumberg
- 1925: Elmar Rähn
- 1926: Richard Ivask
- 1927: Mihkel Liinat
- 1928: Evald Kink
- 1929: Johann Meimer
- 1930: Johann Meimer
- 1931: Edgar Tamm
- 1932: Arnold Niggol
- 1933: Arnold Niggol
- 1934: Elmar Lilienthal
- 1935: Elmar Lilienthal
- 1936: Elmar Rähn
- 1937: Elmar Lilienthal
- 1938: Heino Koik
- 1939: Toivo Õunap
- 1940: Heino Koik
- 1941: -
- 1942: Paul Toomla
- 1943: Johannes Rander
- 1944: Heino Lipp
- 1945: Paul Toomla
- 1946: Heino Lipp
- 1947: Heino Lipp
- 1948: Karl Lont
- 1949: Heino Lipp
- 1950: Heino Lipp
- 1951: Viktor Hellerma
- 1952: Heino Tiik
- 1953: Pavel Šenitsev
- 1954: Heino Tiik
- 1955: Uno Palu
- 1956: Uno Palu
- 1957: Aleksander Transtok
- 1958: Uno Palu
- 1959: Heinrich Kriivan
- 1960: Uno Palu
- 1961: Rein Aun
- 1962: Heino Tiik
- 1963: Uno Palu
- 1964: Uno Palu
- 1965: Priit Paalo
- 1966: Priit Paalo
- 1967: Priit Paalo
- 1968: Rein Tõru
- 1969: Kaidu Meitern
- 1970: Heino Sildoja
- 1971: Jaan Lember
- 1972: Kaidu Meitern
- 1973: Peeter Põld
- 1974: Peeter Põld
- 1975: Peep Tõnisson
- 1976: Toomas Suurväli
- 1977: Tõnu Kaukis
- 1978: Toomas Suurväli
- 1979: Margus Kasearu
- 1980: Tõnu Kaukis
- 1981: Valter Külvet
- 1982: Sven Reintak
- 1983: Urmas Käen
- 1984: Sven Reintak
- 1985: Sven Reintak
- 1986: Tiit Pahker
- 1987: Tiit Pahker
- 1988: Aivar Haller
- 1989: Ain Arro
- 1990: Erki Nool
- 1991: Indrek Kaseorg
- 1992: Erki Nool
- 1993: Indrek Kaseorg
- 1994: Valter Külvet
- 1995: Valter Külvet
- 1996: Raido Mägi
- 1997: Raido Mägi
- 1998: Sven Simuste
- 1999: Aivo Normak
- 2000: Aivo Normak
- 2001: Indrek Kaseorg
- 2002: Villu Sepp
- 2003: Indrek Kaseorg
- 2004: Päärn Brauer
- 2005: Andres Raja
- 2006: Andres Raja
- 2007: Aigar Kukk
- 2008: Mikk Pahapill
- 2009: Indrek Turi
- 2010: Andres Raja
- 2011: Tarmo Riitmuru
- 2012: Hendrik Lepik
- 2013: Andres Raja
- 2014: Kaarel Jõeväli
- 2015: Taavi Tšernjavski
- 2016: Kristjan Rosenberg
- 2017: Taavi Tšernjavski
- 2018: Taavi Tšernjavski
- 2019: Janek Õiglane
- 2020: Risto Lillemets
- 2021: Kristjan Rosenberg
- 2022: Maicel Uibo

== Finland ==
- 1980: Johannes Lahti
- 1981: Kari-Pekka Lax
- 1982: Johannes Lahti
- 1983: Jarmo Mäkelä
- 1984: Harri Sundell
- 1985: Henrik Broman
- 1986: Henrik Broman
- 1987: Petri Keskitalo
- 1988: Kaj Ekman
- 1989: Mikko Valle
- 1990: Kaj Ekman
- 1991: Jari Näkki
- 1992: Mikko Valle
- 1993: Mikko Valle
- 1994: Jarkko Finni
- 1995: Mikko Valle
- 1996: Mikko Valle
- 1997: Mikko Valle
- 1998: Mikko Valle
- 1999: Glenn Lindqvist
- 2000: Eduard Hämäläinen
- 2001: Jukka Väkeväinen
- 2002: Jukka Väkeväinen
- 2003: Henri Kokkonen
- 2004: Jaakko Ojaniemi
- 2005: Aki Heikkinen
- 2006: Lassi Raunio
- 2007: Jaakko Ojaniemi
- 2008: Jaakko Ojaniemi
- 2009: Tero Ojala
- 2010: Lassi Raunio
- 2011: Sami Itani

== France ==
- 1980: Jean-Philippe Sommero
- 1981: Yves Le Roy
- 1982: Didier Claverie
- 1983: Didier Claverie
- 1984: Frédéric Sacco
- 1985: William Motti
- 1986: Alain Blondel
- 1987: Christian Plaziat
- 1988: Christian Plaziat
- 1989: Christian Plaziat
- 1990: Christian Plaziat
- 1991: William Motti
- 1992: Alain Blondel
- 1993: Not Held
- 1994: Sébastien Levicq
- 1995: Olivier Coche
- 1996: Wilfrid Boulineau
- 1997: Lionel Marceny
- 1998: Gaëtan Blouin
- 1999: Cédric Lopez
- 2000: Laurent Hernu
- 2001: Gaëtan Blouin
- 2002: Laurent Hernu
- 2003: Laurent Hernu
- 2004: Gaëtan Blouin
- 2005: Romain Barras
- 2006: Nadir El Fassi
- 2007: Rudy Bourguignon
- 2008: Franck Logel
- 2009: Nadir El Fassi

== Germany ==
=== East Germany ===
- 1980: Dietmar Jentsch
- 1981: Rainer Pottel
- 1982: Torsten Voss
- 1983: Torsten Voss
- 1984: Uwe Freimuth
- 1985: Uwe Freimuth
- 1986: Uwe Freimuth
- 1987: Torsten Voss
- 1988: Uwe Freimuth
- 1989: René Günther
- 1990: Torsten Voss

=== West Germany ===
- 1980: Guido Kratschmer
- 1981: Andreas Rizzi
- 1982: Jürgen Hingsen
- 1983: Siegfried Wentz
- 1984: Not held
- 1985: Siegfried Wentz
- 1986: Jens Schulze
- 1987: Michael Neugebauer
- 1988: Rainer Sonnenburg
- 1989: Karl-Heinz Fichtner
- 1990: Michael Kohnle

=== Unified Germany ===
- 1991: Christian Schenk
- 1992: Stefan Schmid
- 1993: Christian Schenk
- 1994: Norbert Demmel
- 1995: Michael Kohnle
- 1996: Stefan Schmid
- 1997: Mike Maczey
- 1998: Dirk-Achim Pajonk
- 1999: Mike Maczey
- 2000: Florian Schönbeck
- 2001: Jörg Goedicke
- 2002: Florian Schönbeck
- 2003: Matthias Spahn
- 2004: Christopher Hallmann
- 2005: Jacob Minah
- 2006: Lars Albert
- 2007: Lars Albert
- 2008: Norman Müller
- 2009: Jan Felix Knobel
- 2010: Michael Schrader
- 2011: André Niklaus
- 2012: Kai Kazmirek

== Hungary ==
- 1980: László Nagy
- 1981: Árpád Kiss
- 1982: József Hoffer
- 1983: József Hoffer
- 1984: József Hoffer
- 1985: Béla Vágó
- 1986: Béla Vágó
- 1987: Dezső Szabó
- 1988: Dezső Szabó
- 1989: Dezső Szabó
- 1990: Dezső Szabó
- 1991: Dezső Szabó
- 1992: Sándor Munkácsi
- 1993: Sándor Munkácsi
- 1994: Zsolt Kürtösi
- 1995: Sándor Munkácsi
- 1996: Márk Váczi
- 1997: Sándor Munkácsi
- 1998: Zsolt Kürtösi
- 1999: Viktor Kovács
- 2000: Zsolt Kürtösi
- 2001: Tamás Polonyi
- 2002: Zsolt Kürtösi
- 2003: Zsolt Kürtösi
- 2004: Zsolt Kürtösi
- 2005: Péter Skoumal
- 2006:
- 2007: Attila Szabó
- 2008:
- 2009: Attila Szabó

== Japan ==
- 1980: Hirokazu Kobayashi
- 1981: Mitsugi Ogata
- 1982: Mitsugi Ogata
- 1983: Takeshi Kojo
- 1984: Takeshi Kojo
- 1985: Takeshi Kojo
- 1986: Takeshi Kojo
- 1987: Takeshi Kojo
- 1988: Katsuhiko Matsuda
- 1989: Katsuhiko Matsuda
- 1990: Munehiro Kaneko
- 1991: Munehiro Kaneko
- 1992: Munehiro Kaneko
- 1993: Munehiro Kaneko
- 1994: Munehiro Kaneko
- 1995: Munehiro Kaneko
- 1996: Munehiro Kaneko
- 1997: Sō Takei
- 1998: Hitoshi Maruono
- 1999: Tomokazu Sugama
- 2000: Hitoshi Maruono
- 2001: Takuro Hirata
- 2002: Masatoshi Ishizawa
- 2003: Takuro Hirata
- 2004: Hiromasa Tanaka
- 2005: Hiromasa Tanaka
- 2006: Hiromasa Tanaka
- 2007: Hiromasa Tanaka
- 2008: Hiromasa Tanaka
- 2009: Daisuke Ikeda
- 2010: Keisuke Ushiro
- 2011: Keisuke Ushiro
- 2012: Keisuke Ushiro
- 2013: Keisuke Ushiro
- 2014: Keisuke Ushiro
- 2015: Keisuke Ushiro
- 2016: Akihiko Nakamura
- 2017: Keisuke Ushiro
- 2018: Keisuke Ushiro
- 2019: Keisuke Ushiro

== Latvia ==
- 1991: Rojs Piziks
- 1992: Ronalds Blûms
- 1993: Rojs Piziks
- 1994: Gvido Einbergs
- 1995: Rojs Piziks
- 1996: Rojs Piziks
- 1997: Mârcis Rullis
- 1998: Intars Dîcmanis
- 1999: Egons Lâcis
- 2000: Aigars Brûveris
- 2001: Normunds Jakušonoks
- 2002: Atis Vaisjûns
- 2003: Jânis Karlivâns
- 2004: Jânis Karlivâns
- 2005: Atis Vaisjûns
- 2006: Atis Vaisjûns

== Lithuania ==
- 1990: Tomas Onuškevicius
- 1991: Rišardas Malachovskis
- 1992: Tomas Onuškevicius
- 1993: Audrius Rankelé
- 1994: Tomas Onuškevicius
- 1995: Ramûnas Pugžlys
- 1996: no contest
- 1997: Ramûnas Pugžlys
- 1998: Regimantas Kicas
- 1999: Regimantas Kicas
- 2000: Jonas Spudis
- 2001: Jonas Spudis
- 2002: Gvidas Vorotinskas
- 2003: Mindaugas Šerepka
- 2004: Jonas Spudis
- 2005: Aivaras Aksionovas
- 2006: Aidas Aleksonis

== Netherlands ==
- 1980: Frans van der Ham
- 1981: Robert de Wit
- 1982: Robert de Wit
- 1983: Guido van der Sluis
- 1984: Robert de Wit
- 1985: Enno Tjepkema
- 1986: Nick Mosselman
- 1987: Cor Troost
- 1988: Robert de Wit
- 1989: Yvo van den Heuvel
- 1990: Enno Tjepkema
- 1991: Marcel Dost
- 1992: Marcel Dost
- 1993: Ruben van Balen
- 1994: Marcel Dost
- 1995: Remco van Veldhuizen
- 1996: Jack Rosendaal
- 1997: Bart Bennema
- 1998: Chiel Warners
- 1999: Jack Rosendaal
- 2000: Chiel Warners
- 2001: Rick Wassenaar
- 2002: Rick Wassenaar
- 2003: Eugene Martineau
- 2004: Joost van Bennekom
- 2005: Ludo van der Plaat
- 2006: Ludo van der Plaat
- 2007: Pelle Rietveld
- 2008: Ludo van der Plaat
- 2009: Ludo van der Plaat
- 2010: Alwin Roobeek
- 2011: Adriaan Saman
- 2012: Harald Bust
- 2013: Bas Markies
- 2014: Bas Markies

== New Zealand ==
- 1980: Robert Sadler
- 1981: Grant Connon
- 1982: Grant Connon
- 1983: Paul Wilson
- 1984: Simon Poelman
- 1985: Simon Poelman
- 1986: Simon Poelman
- 1987: Simon Poelman
- 1988: Terry Lomax
- 1989: Terry Lomax
- 1990: Simon Poelman
- 1991: Simon Poelman
- 1992: Simon Poelman
- 1993: Doug Pirini
- 1994: Grant Chapman
- 1995: Doug Pirini
- 1996: Doug Pirini
- 1997: Gene Pateman
- 1998: Doug Pirini
- 1999: Gene Pateman
- 2000: Sean Gourley
- 2001: David Hansen
- 2002: Sean Gourley
- 2003: Scott McLaren
- 2004: Peter Cox
- 2005: Brent Newdick
- 2006: Brent Newdick
- 2007: None
- 2008: Kris McCarthy (Australia)
- 2009: Brent Newdick
- 2010: Brent Newdick
- 2011: Brent Newdick
- 2012: Nicholas Gerrard

== Poland ==
- 1980: Janusz Szczerkowski
- 1981: Marek Kubiszewski
- 1982: Wojciech Podsiadło
- 1983: Maciej Jędral
- 1984: Wojciech Podsiadło
- 1985: Marek Kubiszewski
- 1986: Janusz Leśniewicz
- 1987: Wojciech Podsiadło
- 1988: Dariusz Grad
- 1989: Dariusz Grad
- 1990: Andrzej Wyżykowski
- 1991: Sebastian Chmara
- 1992: Michał Krukowski
- 1993: Grzegorz Stromiński
- 1994: Sebastian Chmara
- 1995: Grzegorz Stromiński
- 1996: Maciej Chmara
- 1997: Maciej Chmara
- 1998: Michał Modelski
- 1999: Michał Modelski
- 2000: Michał Modelski
- 2001: Michał Modelski
- 2002: Krzysztof Andrzejak
- 2003: Krzysztof Andrzejak
- 2004: Michał Modelski
- 2005: Łukasz Płaczek
- 2006: Łukasz Płaczek
- 2007: Marcin Dróżdż
- 2008: Marcin Dróżdż
- 2009: Łukasz Płaczek
- 2010: Jacek Nabożny
- 2011: Marcin Dróżdż
- 2012: Paweł Wiesiołek
- 2013: Marcin Przybył
- 2014: Paweł Wiesiołek
- 2015: Paweł Wiesiołek
- 2016: Paweł Wiesiołek
- 2017: Rafał Abramowski
- 2018: Paweł Wiesiołek
- 2019: Paweł Wiesiołek

== Portugal ==
- 1980: João Campos
- 1981: Pedro Albuquerque Martins
- 1982: Pedro Albuquerque Martins
- 1983: Pedro Albuquerque Martins
- 1984: Pedro Albuquerque Martins
- 1985: Joaquim Carvalho
- 1986: Carlos Cunha
- 1987: Paulo Barrigana
- 1988: José Durão
- 1989: José Durão
- 1990: Mário Aníbal Ramos
- 1991: José Durão
- 1992: Francisco Nuno Fernandes
- 1993: Mário Aníbal Ramos
- 1994: Mário Aníbal Ramos
- 1995: Mário Aníbal Ramos
- 1996: Luís Herédio Costa
- 1997: Paulo Massinga
- 1998: Pedro Veloso
- 1999: Pedro Veloso
- 2000: Mário Aníbal Ramos
- 2001: Mário Aníbal Ramos
- 2002: Carlos Sá
- 2003: Mário Aníbal Ramos
- 2004: Carlos Sá
- 2005: Tiago Marto
- 2006: Cláudio Gama
- 2007: Tiago Marto
- 2008: Tiago Marto
- 2009: -
- 2010: Tiago Marto
- 2011: Tiago Marto
- 2012: Tiago Marto

== Sweden ==
- 1980: Christer Lythell
- 1981: Christer Lythell
- 1982: Conny Silfver
- 1983: Conny Silfver
- 1984: Staffan Blomstrand
- 1985: Sten Ekberg
- 1986: Mikael Olander
- 1987: Sten Ekberg
- 1988: Bengt Järlsjö
- 1989: Henrik Dagård
- 1990: Sten Ekberg
- 1991: Sten Ekberg
- 1992: Sten Ekberg
- 1993: Glenn Håkansson
- 1994: Einar Cronstedt
- 1995: Robert Wärff
- 1996: Robert Wärff
- 1997: Michael Hoffer
- 1998: Henrik Dagård
- 1999: Michael Hoffer
- 2000: Christer Holger
- 2001: Patrik Melin
- 2002: Andrus Klaar
- 2003: Andrus Klaar
- 2004: Patrik Melin
- 2005: Daniel Almgren
- 2006: Daniel Almgren
- 2007: Daniel Almgren
- 2008: Björn Barrefors

== Switzerland ==
- 1980: Michele Rüfenacht
- 1981: Stephan Niklaus
- 1982: Stephan Niklaus
- 1983: Stephan Niklaus
- 1984: Michele Rüfenacht
- 1985: Christian Gugler
- 1986: Beat Gähwiler
- 1987: Michele Rüfenacht
- 1988: Beat Gähwiler
- 1989: Jann Trefny
- 1990: Beat Gähwiler
- 1991: Beat Gähwiler
- 1992: Beat Gähwiler
- 1993: Mirko Spada
- 1994: Mirko Spada
- 1995: Rolf Schläfli
- 1996: Beat Gähwiler
- 1997: Philipp Huber
- 1998: Rolf Schläfli
- 1999: Ronald Thalmann
- 2000: Adrian Krebs
- 2001: Adrian Krebs
- 2002: Daniel Weder
- 2003: Xavier Weibel
- 2004: David Gervasi
- 2005: David Gervasi

== Ukraine ==
- 1992: Vitaliy Kolpakov
- 1993: Vitaliy Kolpakov
- 1994: Serhiy Blonskyi
- 1995: Serhiy Blonskyi
- 1996: Victor Dyshlyak
- 1997: Volodymyr Mykhailenko
- 1998: Volodymyr Mykhailenko
- 1999: Yuriy Zhuravskyi
- 2000: Fedir Laukhin
- 2001: Serhiy Blonskyi
- 2002: ???
- 2003: Fedir Laukhin
- 2004: Oleksandr Yurkov
- 2005: Yuriy Blonskyi
- 2006: Mykola Shulga
- 2007: Mykola Shulga
- 2008: ???
- 2009: Yevhen Nikitin
- 2010: Yevhen Nikitin
- 2011: Yevhen Nikitin
- 2012: ???
- 2013: Vasyl Ivanytskyi
- 2014: Vasyl Ivanytskyi
- 2015: Serhiy Yarokhovych
- 2016: Vasyl Ivanytskyi
- 2017: Serhiy Yarokhovych
- 2018: Vasyl Ivanytskyi
- 2019: Ruslan Maloglovets
- 2020: Oleksiy Kasyanov

== United States ==
- 1980: Bobby Coffman
- 1981: John Crist
- 1982: Mark Anderson
- 1983: Mark Anderson
- 1984: John Crist
- 1985: John Sayre
- 1986: Dave Johnson
- 1987: Tim Bright
- 1988: Gary Kinder
- 1989: Dave Johnson
- 1990: Dave Johnson
- 1991: Dan O'Brien
- 1992: Dave Johnson
- 1993: Dan O'Brien
- 1994: Dan O'Brien
- 1995: Dan O'Brien
- 1996: Dan O'Brien
- 1997: Steve Fritz
- 1998: Chris Huffins
- 1999: Chris Huffins
- 2000: Tom Pappas
- 2001: Kip Janvrin
- 2002: Tom Pappas
- 2003: Tom Pappas
- 2004: Bryan Clay
- 2005: Bryan Clay
- 2006: Tom Pappas
- 2007: Tom Pappas
- 2008: Bryan Clay
- 2009: Trey Hardee
- 2010: Jake Arnold
- 2011: Ashton Eaton
- 2012: Ashton Eaton WR
- 2013: Ashton Eaton
- 2014: Trey Hardee
- 2015: Trey Hardee
- 2016: Ashton Eaton
- 2017: Trey Hardee
- 2018: Zach Ziemek
- 2019: Devon Williams
