= 1986 European Athletics Championships – Men's decathlon =

Men's decathlon at the European Athletics Championships

These are the official results of the men's decathlon competition at the 1986 European Athletics Championships in Stuttgart, West Germany, held at Neckarstadion on 27 and 28 August 1986.

== Medalists ==
Gold	(United Kingdom) Daley Thompson; Great Britain (GBR)
Silver	Jürgen Hingsen; West Germany (FRG)
Bronze	Siegfried Wentz; West Germany (FRG)

== Final ==
KEY:	DNF	Did not finish	CR	Championships record	NR	National record	PB	Personal best	SB	Seasonal best	w	Wind assisted

The highest mark recorded in each event is highlighted in yellow

Rank	Name	Nationality	100m	LJ	SP	HJ	400m	110m H	DT	PV	JT	1500m	Points	Notes
1st place, gold medalist(s)	Daley Thompson	United Kingdom	10.26	7.72	15.73	2.00	47.02	14.04	43.38	5.10	62.78	4:26.16	8811	CR
2nd place, silver medalist(s)	Jürgen Hingsen	West Germany	10.87 w	7.89 w	16.46	2.12	48.79	14.52	48.42	4.60	64.38	4:21.61	8730	
3rd place, bronze medalist(s)	Siegfried Wentz	West Germany	10.83	7.60	15.45	2.12	47.57	14.07	45.66	4.90	65.34	4:35.00	8676	
4	Torsten Voss	East Germany	10.53 w	7.85 w	14.93	2.09	48.03	14.91	43.64	5.10	57.76	4:47.15	8450	
5	Aleksandr Apaychev	Soviet Union	11.14	7.25	15.57	1.88	49.45	14.29	45.82	4.80	64.84	4:28.66	8199	
6	Uwe Freimuth	East Germany	11.02	7.25	15.28	1.97	48.35	14.85	45.94	4.90	60.36	4:34.54	8197	
7	Christian Plaziat	France	10.84 w	7.36 w	14.73	2.15	50.03	14.83	45.40	4.70	57.10	4:35.20	8196	
8	Alain Blondel	France	10.74 w	7.42	13.27	2.00	47.79	14.34	39.22	4.90	55.18	4:18.97	8185	
9	Robert de Wit	Netherlands	11.07 w	7.05	14.04	2.00	49.35	14.58	43.34	4.80	54.74	4:26.09	7962	NR
10	Sten Ekberg	Sweden	11.07 w	7.05	13.55	2.06	49.46	15.12	43.98	4.50	57.86	4:19.96	7930	
11	Eugene Gilkes	United Kingdom	10.64 w	7.00	14.92	1.94	47.60	15.26	43.50	4.40	48.42	4:18.91	7888	
12	Mikael Olander	Sweden	11.29 w	6.78 w	15.62	1.97	50.85	16.16	46.30	4.60	72.50	4:33.46	7888	
13	Beat Gahwiler	Switzerland	11.14 w	7.06 w	14.15	1.94	49.21	15.30	40.36	4.60	63.68	4:22.19	7862	
14	Lars Warming	Denmark	10.82 w	7.03	13.52	1.94	47.76	14.54	40.48	4.60	44.00	4:19.49	7776	
15	Patrick Vetterli	Switzerland	11.23 w	6.77 w	14.27	2.03	49.79	15.06	45.40	4.40	57.06	4:53.62	7609	
16	Petri Keskitalo	Finland	10.67 w	7.57	14.03	1.97	51.47	14.66	33.62	4.60	53.92	5:20.66	7452	
17	Carlos O'Connell	Ireland	11.04 w	7.21	11.53	1.85	49.29	15.36	34.72	4.30	51.96	4:19.56	7312	
18	Staffan Blomstrand	Sweden	11.05 w	6.78 w	14.10	1.97	48.95	16.19	43.64	4.50	61.70		DNF	
19	Grigoriy Degtyarov	Soviet Union	10.99	7.26	14.72	2.00	50.04	15.11	44.48				DNF	
20	Jurgen Mandl	Austria	10.95 w	7.09 w	14.27	1.94	50.67	14.98	39.16				DNF	
21	William Motti	France	11.26 w	7.00 w	13.96	1.70	DNF	DNF	38.50				DNF	
22	Guido Kratschmer	West Germany	10.62	7.50									DNF	
23	Valter Külvet	Soviet Union	11.48 w	6.71									DNF	

== Participation ==
According to an unofficial count, 23 athletes from 12 countries participated in the event.

- Austria (1)
- Denmark (1)
- East Germany (2)
- Finland (1)
- France (3)
- Ireland (1)
- Netherlands (1)
- Soviet Union (3)
- Sweden (3)
- Switzerland (2)
- United Kingdom (2)
- West Germany (3)

== See also ==
- Athletics at the 1984 Summer Olympics – Men's decathlon
- 1987 World Championships in Athletics – Men's decathlon
- 1986 Hypo-Meeting
- Athletics at the 1988 Summer Olympics – Men's decathlon
