= 1992 in the decathlon =

This page lists the World Best Year Performance in the year 1992 in the men's decathlon. One of the main events during this season were the 1992 Olympic Games in Barcelona, Spain, where the competition started on August 5, 1992, and ended on August 6, 1992.

== Records ==
Standing records prior to the 1992 season in track and field
World Record	Daley Thompson (GBR)	8847	August 9, 1984	Los Angeles, United States
Broken records during the 1992 season in track and field
World Record	Dan O'Brien (USA)	8891	September 5, 1992	Talence, France

== 1992 World Year Ranking ==
Rank	Points	Athlete	Venue	Date	Note
1	8891	Dan O'Brien (USA)	Talence, France	1992-09-05	WR
2	8649	Dave Johnson (USA)	New Orleans, United States	1992-06-27	
3	8627	Robert Změlík (TCH)	Götzis, Austria	1992-05-31	PB
4	8412	Antonio Peñalver (ESP)	Barcelona, Spain	1992-08-06	
5	8409	Michael Smith (CAN)	Götzis, Austria	1992-05-31	
6	8285	Alain Blondel (FRA)	Talence, France	1992-09-05	
7	8276	Brian Brophy (USA)	Austin, United States	1992-06-06	PB
8	8246	Sten Ekberg (SWE)	Värnamo, Sweden	1992-07-05	PB
9	8237	Aric Long (USA)	New Orleans, United States	1992-06-27	PB
10	8225	Sheldon Blockburger (USA)	Baton Rouge, United States	1992-03-28	
11	8220	Frank Müller (GER)	Götzis, Austria	1992-05-31	
12	8199	Dezső Szabó (HUN)	Barcelona, Spain	1992-08-06	
13	8195	Rob Muzzio (USA)	Barcelona, Spain	1992-08-06	
14	8192	Paul Meier (GER)	Barcelona, Spain	1992-08-06	
15	8176	Pedro da Silva (BRA)	Austin, United States	1992-06-06	
16	8164	William Motti (FRA)	Barcelona, Spain	1992-08-06	
17	8160	Ramil Ganiyev (EUN)	Barcelona, Spain	1992-08-06	
18	8153	Robert de Wit (NED)	Götzis, Austria	1992-05-31	
19	8148	Viktor Radchenko (EUN)	Götzis, Austria	1992-05-31	PB
20	8131	Gernot Kellermayr (AUT)	Götzis, Austria	1992-05-31	NR
21	8126	Derek Huff (USA)	Tucson, United States	1992-03-19	
22	8091	Valter Külvet (EST)	Alhama de Murcia, Spain	1992-05-24	
23	8087	Muhammad Oliver (USA)	Austin, United States	1992-06-06	PB
24	8073	Steve Fritz (USA)	Stockholm, Sweden	1992-07-26	
25	8070	Thorsten Dauth (GER)	Bernhausen, Germany	1992-06-20	

== See also ==
- 1992 Hypo-Meeting
- 1992 Décastar
