= 1986 Hypo-Meeting =

Austrian athletics meeting

The 12th edition of the annual Hypo-Meeting took place on May 24 and May 25, 1986 in Götzis, Austria. The track and field competition featured a men's decathlon and a women's heptathlon event.

== Men's Decathlon ==
=== Schedule ===
May 24
1. 100 m
2. Long Jump
3. Shot Put
4. High Jump
5. 400 m

May 25
6. 110 m hurdles
7. Discus Throw
8. Pole Vault
9. Javelin Throw
10. 1,500 m

=== Records ===
World Record	Daley Thompson (GBR)	8847	August 9, 1984	Los Angeles, United States
Event Record	Daley Thompson (GBR)	8730	May 23, 1982	Götzis, Austria

=== Results ===
Rank	Athlete	Decathlon										Points
Rank	Athlete	1	2	3	4	5	6	7	8	9	10	Points
1	Guido Kratschmer (FRG)	10,82	7.76	16.62	1.93	48,75	14,09	48.42	4.60	63.82	4:32,36	8519
2	Uwe Freimuth (GDR)	11,23	7.57	15.80	1.93	49,50	14,79	47.98	4.90	64.78	4:29,22	8322
3	Thomas Fahner (GDR)	10,82	7.29	13.96	1.90	47,90	14,96	43.52	5.10	61.88	4:31,47	8170
4	Aleksandr Apaychev (URS)	11,45	7.23	15.76	1.90	50,38	14,43	43.46	4.50	68.62	4:28,54	8016
5	Jens Petersson (GDR)	10,83	7.66	14.82	1.90	48,21	14,91	42.38	4.50	52.58	4:47,02	7863
6	Robert de Wit (NED)	11,31	7.04	14.28	1.90	49,48	14,46	42.34	4.90	54.72	4:26,90	7846
7	Aleksandr Nevskiy (URS)	11,16	7.23	15.22	1.96	50,19	15,13	44.42	4.60	58.26	4:39,75	7843
8	Nikolai Afanasyev (URS)	11,18	6.93	12.20	1.96	49,15	14,62	38.16	4.70	63.74	4:26,51	7762
9	Hans-Joachim Häberle (FRG)	11,23	7.29	14.28	1.81	48,96	15,57	44.36	4.40	61.46	4:25.03	7742
10	Andreas Rizzi (FRG)	10,83	7.29	15.35	1.90	49,32	15,37	46.00	4.30	48.60	4:39,50	7698
11	Jürgen Mandl (AUT)	11,15	7.20	13.63	1.90	49,90	14,72	40.58	4.40	65.22	4:51,46	7646
12	Béla Vágó (HUN)	11,18	7.45	14.04	2.05	50,24	16,02	41.96	4.70	55.54	4:56,61	7631
13	Lars Warming (DEN)	11,17	6.96	12.57	1.93	48,31	14,71	40.68	4.70	45.72	4:19,68	7624
14	Stephan Niklaus (SUI)	11,10	6.77	14.81	1.96	50,18	15,41	45.52	4.00	72.24	5:00,76	7624
15	Roman Hrabaň (TCH)	11,09	6.96	15.00	1.87	49,81	15,17	45.82	4.60	54.62	4:53,98	7600
16	Patrick Vetterli (SUI)	11,35	6.91	13.51	2.05	50,84	15,11	38.96	4.30	60.48	5:02,03	7374
17	Gernot Kellermayr (AUT)	11,19	6.97	12.07	1.84	49,57	15,61	37.38	4.40	55.36	4:51,30	7132
18	Michael Neugebauer (FRG)	11,03	7.45	13.68	2.05	49,24	14,17	41.86	—	54.34	4:52,76	7095
19	Kevin Atkinson (IRL)	11,52	6.84	11.53	1.84	49,68	15,62	33.42	4.20	49.90	4:36,62	6862
—	Siegfried Wentz (FRG)	11,00	7.52	15.43	2.05	47,85	14,10	46.48	4.70	—	—	DNF

== Women's heptathlon ==
=== Schedule ===
May 24
1. 100 m hurdles
2. High Jump
3. Shot Put
4. 200 m

May 25
5. Long Jump
6. Javelin Throw
7. 800 m

=== Records ===
World Record	Sabine John (GDR)	6946	May 6, 1984	Potsdam, East Germany
Event Record	Jane Frederick (USA)	6666	May 26, 1985	Götzis, Austria

== See also ==
- 1986 European Athletics Championships – Men's decathlon
- 1986 European Athletics Championships – Women's heptathlon
