= 1989 Hypo-Meeting =

The 15th edition of the annual Hypo-Meeting took place on June 17 and June 18, 1989 in Götzis, Austria. The track and field competition featured a decathlon (men) and a heptathlon (women) event.

== Men's Decathlon ==
=== Schedule ===
June 17
1. 100 m
2. Long Jump
3. Shot Put
4. High Jump
5. 400 m

June 18
6. 110 m hurdles
7. Discus Throw
8. Pole Vault
9. Javelin Throw
10. 1,500 m

=== Records ===
World Record	Daley Thompson (GBR)	8847	August 9, 1984	Los Angeles, United States
Event Record	Daley Thompson (GBR)	8730	May 23, 1982	Götzis, Austria

=== Results ===
Rank	Athlete	Decathlon										Points
Rank	Athlete	1	2	3	4	5	6	7	8	9	10	Points
1	Christian Plaziat (FRA)	10,68	7.77	14.06	2.11	47,83	14,03	43.28	4.90	52.36	4:23,49	8485
2	Christian Schenk (GDR)	11,24	7.63	15.08	2.17	48,88	14,89	43.82	4.50	63.80	4:23,16	8351
3	Norbert Demmel (FRG)	11,20	7.06	16.24	1.96	48,59	14,76	52.98	4.40	55.44	4:24,51	8152
4	Michael Smith (CAN)	11,01	7.32	14.04	2.14	51,34	14,69	43.58	4.30	67.58	4:25,66	8121
5	Dezső Szabó (HUN)	11,03	7.54	13.55	2.05	48,25	14,89	38.36	4.80	59.04	4:26,59	8080
6	Siegfried Wentz (FRG)	11,17	7.00	15.02	2.02	48,97	14,25	45.30	4.40	61.08	4:41,19	7986
7	William Motti (FRA)	11,60	7.02	16.16	2.08	52,11	15,38	50.98	4.40	67.00	4:45,34	7926
8	Michael Arnold (AUT)	10,83	7.93	13.04	1.96	50,46	14,38	42.88	4.30	54.64	4:39,37	7866
9	René Günther (GDR)	11,59	7.00	14.56	1.96	49,57	14,87	48.42	4.60	55.30	4:27,40	7835
10	Robert Změlík (TCH)	10,92	7.42	13.38	2.02	50,74	14,07	35.88	4.70	52.80	4:39,85	7762
11	Knut Harald Gundersen (NOR)	11,41	7.15	15.37	1.99	52,16	15,15	45.52	4.50	59.44	4:33,99	7762
12	Christian Deick (FRG)	11,13	7.07	14.66	1.93	49,79	15,09	47.50	4.30	53.30	4:33,61	7713
13	Nikolay Zayats (URS)	10,99	7.09	14.02	1.99	47,77	14,81	36.24	4.80	51.92	4:55,42	7656
14	Patrick Vetterli (SUI)	11,52	6.47	15.57	2.02	49,43	14,93	45.76	4.60	54.34	4:54,59	7602
15	Alfred Stummer (AUT)	11,08	7.49	12.97	1.93	49,60	15,17	36.26	4.20	47.58	4:14,46	7507
16	Severin Moser (SUI)	10,97	7.08	12.41	1.87	49,24	14,94	37.00	4.70	48.62	4:28,46	7471
17	Sándor Munkácsi (HUN)	11,19	7.17	12.29	1.84	49,64	14,93	38.00	4.00	50.14	4:14,16	7331
18	Dag Frode Skogheim (NOR)	11,38	7.08	11.59	1.99	49,94	14,90	37.84	4.40	50.04	4:39,59	7290
19	Robert Pracher (AUT)	11,51	6.91	13.24	1.84	52,20	14,95	43.14	4.20	49.30	4:37,67	7132
20	Bart Goodell (USA)	11,29	6.80	15.44	1.96	49,88	14,85	46.30	NM	61.98	5:04,29	6933
—	Thomas Birnleitner (AUT)	11,36	6.92	12.87	1.93	51,36	15,71	DNS	—	—	—	DNF
—	Gernot Kellermayr (AUT)	11,07	6.90	12.40	1.84	DNS	—	—	—	—	—	DNF

== Women's Heptathlon ==
=== Schedule ===
June 17
1. 100 m hurdles
2. High Jump
3. Shot Put
4. 200 m

June 18
5. Long Jump
6. Javelin Throw
7. 800 m

=== Records ===
World Record	Jackie Joyner-Kersee (USA)	7291	September 24, 1988	Seoul, South Korea
Event Record	Jackie Joyner-Kersee (USA)	6841	May 25, 1986	Götzis, Austria
