= 1987 Hypo-Meeting =

The 13th edition of the annual Hypo-Meeting took place on May 23 and May 24, 1987 in Götzis, Austria. The track and field competition featured a decathlon (men) and a heptathlon (women) event.

== Men's Decathlon ==
=== Schedule ===
May 23
1. 100 m
2. Long Jump
3. Shot Put
4. High Jump
5. 400 m

May 24
6. 110 m hurdles
7. Discus Throw
8. Pole Vault
9. Javelin Throw
10. 1,500 m

=== Records ===
| World Record | Daley Thompson (GBR) | 8847 | August 9, 1984 | Los Angeles, United States |
| Event Record | Daley Thompson (GBR) | 8730 | May 23, 1982 | Götzis, Austria |

=== Results ===
| Rank | Athlete | Decathlon | | | | | | | | | | Points |
| Rank | Athlete | 1 | 2 | 3 | 4 | 5 | 6 | 7 | 8 | 9 | 10 | Points |
|---|---|---|---|---|---|---|---|---|---|---|---|---|
| 1 | Siegfried Wentz (FRG) | 10,85 | 7.49 | 15.82 | 2.05 | 47,55 | 13,96 | 48,20 | 4.80 | 65.50 | 4:34,58 | 8645 |
| 2 | Torsten Voss (GDR) | 10,59 | 7.78 | 14.84 | 2.05 | 47,94 | 14,39 | 42,42 | 4.70 | 54.10 | 4:33,28 | 8331 |
| 3 | Alain Blondel (FRA) | 10,97 | 7.50 | 13.47 | 1.99 | 47,72 | 14,24 | 41,46 | 5.00 | 54.94 | 4:21,26 | 8228 |
| 4 | Uwe Freimuth (GDR) | 11,02 | 7.48 | 16.16 | 1.99 | 50,94 | 14,83 | 46.84 | 4.90 | 61.02 | 4:37,32 | 8218 |
| 5 | Christian Schenk (GDR) | 11,31 | 7.69 | 14.94 | 2.17 | 49,58 | 15,11 | 46.14 | 4.20 | 60.92 | 4:31,05 | 8147 |
| 6 | Michael Smith (CAN) | 10,96 | 7.40 | 14.26 | 2.08 | 48,13 | 14,62 | 43.82 | 4.30 | 61.92 | 4:34,92 | 8126 |
| 7 | Karl-Heinz Fichtner (FRG) | 11,05 | 7.47 | 15.10 | 1.99 | 50,24 | 15,11 | 46.76 | 5.00 | 54.24 | 4:35,42 | 8081 |
| 8 | Andrey Fomochkin (URS) | 10,67 | 7.20 | 13.88 | 1.96 | 48,24 | 14,76 | 43.80 | 4.40 | 56.32 | 4:34,64 | 7932 |
| 9 | Lars Warming (DEN) | 11,13 | 6.98 | 13.46 | 1.96 | 48,23 | 14,42 | 42.34 | 4.70 | 48.78 | 4:21,46 | 7826 |
| 13 | Andreas Rizzi (FRG) | 10,72 | 7.35 | 15.03 | 1.96 | 48,65 | 15,23 | 45.30 | 4.20 | 48.90 | 4:32,84 | 7825 |
| 15 | Gordon Orlikow (CAN) | 10,81 | 7.17 | 13.39 | 1.84 | 48,31 | 14,48 | 40.34 | 4.60 | 50.30 | 4:26,05 | 7741 |
| 16 | Hans-Joachim Häberle (FRG) | 11,07 | 7.16 | 13.73 | 1.87 | 48,92 | 15,60 | 42.78 | 4.30 | 61.36 | 4:24,05 | 7704 |
| 17 | Béla Vágó (HUN) | 11,11 | 7.44 | 14.06 | 2.02 | 50,25 | 15,95 | 41.50 | 4.50 | 50.42 | 4:55.95 | 7484 |
| 18 | Mike Ramos (USA) | 10,76 | 7.19 | 14.76 | 2.05 | 50,50 | 14,83 | 45.88 | 4.80 | 59.76 | DNF | 7429 |
| 20 | Michael Arnold (AUT) | 11,23 | 6.97 | 13.69 | 2.02 | 50,63 | 14,76 | 40.34 | 3.80 | 56.82 | 4:41,83 | 7405 |
| 21 | Gernot Kellermayr (AUT) | 11,11 | 7.04 | 12.58 | 1.84 | 49,51 | 14,99 | 39.02 | 4.50 | 54.18 | 4:39,80 | 7388 |
| 22 | Chris Branham (USA) | 11,28 | 7.29 | 14.50 | 2.02 | 51,42 | 14,19 | 44.56 | 4.70 | 49.98 | DNF | 7128 |
| 24 | Wolfgang Spann (AUT) | 11,53 | 6.52 | 14.00 | 1.78 | 52,05 | 15,21 | 40.66 | 4.10 | 64.58 | 4:48,63 | 7090 |

== Women's Heptathlon ==
=== Schedule ===
May 23
1. 100 m hurdles
2. High Jump
3. Shot Put
4. 200 m

May 24
5. Long Jump
6. Javelin Throw
7. 800 m

=== Records ===
| World Record | Jackie Joyner-Kersee (USA) | 7158 | August 2, 1986 | Houston, United States |
| Event Record | Jackie Joyner-Kersee (USA) | 6841 | May 25, 1986 | Götzis, Austria |

== See also ==
- 1987 World Championships in Athletics – Men's decathlon
- 1987 World Championships in Athletics – Women's heptathlon
