= 1984 Hypo-Meeting =

The 10th edition of the annual Hypo-Meeting took place on May 19 and May 20, 1984 in Götzis, Austria. The track and field competition featured a decathlon (men) and a heptathlon (women) event.

== Men's Decathlon ==
=== Schedule ===
May 25
1. 100 m
2. Long Jump
3. Shot Put
4. High Jump
5. 400 m

May 26
6. 110 m hurdles
7. Discus Throw
8. Pole Vault
9. Javelin Throw
10. 1,500 m

=== Records ===
World Record	Jürgen Hingsen (FRG)	8779	June 6, 1983	Bernhausen, West Germany
Event Record	Daley Thompson (GBR)	8730	May 23, 1982	Götzis, Austria

=== Results ===
Rank	Athlete	Decathlon										Points
Rank	Athlete	1	2	3	4	5	6	7	8	9	10	Points
1	Grigoriy Degtyaryev (URS)	11,05	7.73	16.14	2.08	49,76	14,45	49.40	4.70	60.70	4:20,49	8556
2	Aleksandr Nevskiy (URS)	10,97	7.24	15.04	2.08	48,44	14,67	46.06	4.70	69.56	4:19,62	8491
3	Siegfried Wentz (FRG)	10,99	7.45	14.78	2.08	47,68	14,16	43.76	4.50	56.50	4:28,71	8257
4	Vadim Podmaryov (URS)	11,14	7.66	15.11	2.11	50,23	14,87	47.38	4.40	56.06	4:36,14	8121
5	Sergei Zhelanov (URS)	11,23	7.41	14.28	2.17	50,20	14,76	43.74	4.60	59.18	4:36,66	8078
6	Hans-Joachim Häberle (FRG)	11,05	7.24	14.34	1.90	47,86	15,25	43.10	4.30	67.14	4:18.22	8053
7	Fritz Mehl (FRG)	11,21	7.33	14.67	1.96	48.38	14.90	43.82	4.10	63.02	4:16,81	8042
8	Stephan Niklaus (SUI)	10,96	7.13	15.00	2.02	49,00	15,17	46.58	4.20	69.94	4:46,89	8036
9	Holger Schmidt (FRG)	10,98	7.25	15.03	1.99	49,99	14,83	46.42	4.20	59.46	4:58,77	7837
10	Adam Bagiński (POL)	11,36	7.18	13.51	2.02	50,26	14,97	42.36	4.50	58.64	4:39.99	7725
11	Jürgen Mandl (AUT)	11,19	7.10	13.60	1.99	50,57	14,57	35.98	4.20	53.50	4:46,61	7382
12	Patrick Vetterli (SUI)	11,36	6.91	14.14	1.99	51,30	15,65	45.18	4.30	62.62	5:10,95	7449
13	Wojciech Podsiadło (POL)	11,39	6.65	13.16	1.93	51,90	14,83	39.34	4.60	53.78	4:29,91	7420
14	Christian Gugler (SUI)	11,76	6.46	13.94	1.90	51,73	15,49	41.32	4.70	64.08	4:38,60	7393
15	Kevin Atkinson (IRL)	11,12	7.33	11.90	1.90	49,08	15,20	34.00	4.10	57.28	4:33,54	7384
16	Weng Kangqiang (CHN)	11,30	7.18	12.53	1.84	51,38	15,55	38.18	4.40	68.12	4:51,32	7349
17	Leszek Smajdor (POL)	11,39	6.97	13.73	1.99	51,39	15,44	38.70	4.10	57.52	4:46,33	7342
18	Nikolay Ivanov (BUL)	11,49	7.13	13.54	1.99	52,75	15,82	43.62	4.20	52.94	4:53,07	7271
19	Chen Zebin (CHN)	11,18	7.19	12.43	1.87	51,96	14,81	39.70	4.40	62.38	5:22,61	7254
20	Mikael Olander (SWE)	11,81	6.13	15.16	1.96	52,78	16,52	43.86	4.20	60.44	4:39,27	7175
21	Michele Rüfenacht (SUI)	10,93	6.94	13.65	1.90	48,58	14,75	43.00	—	50.46	4:40,46	6757
—	Georg Werthner (AUT)	11,55	7.13	13,85	1.96	51,20	15,66	39.82	NM	DNS	—	DNF
—	Otto Petrovic (AUT)	11,88	6.73	12,36	1.96	DNS	—	—	—	—	—	DNF
—	Wolfgang Spann (AUT)	11,43	6.55	13,56	DNS	—	—	—	—	—	—	DNF

== Women's Heptathlon ==
=== Schedule ===
May 25
1. 100 m hurdles
2. High Jump
3. Shot Put
4. 200 m

May 26
5. Long Jump
6. Javelin Throw
7. 800 m

=== Records ===
World Record	Sabine John (GDR)	6946	May 6, 1984	Potsdam, East Germany
Event Record	Natalya Shubenkova (URS)	6517	May 29, 1983	Götzis, Austria
