= 1992 Hypo-Meeting =

The 18th edition of the annual Hypo-Meeting took place on May 30 and May 31, 1992 in Götzis, Austria. The track and field competition featured a men's decathlon and a women's heptathlon. It was the highest level combined events meet prior to the start of the 1992 Summer Olympics in Barcelona, Spain.

== Men's decathlon ==
=== Schedule ===
May 30
1. 100 m
2. Long Jump
3. Shot Put
4. High Jump
5. 400 m

May 31
6. 110 m hurdles
7. Discus Throw
8. Pole Vault
9. Javelin Throw
10. 1,500 m

=== Records ===
| World Record | Daley Thompson (GBR) | 8847 | August 9, 1984 | Los Angeles, United States |
| Event Record | Daley Thompson (GBR) | 8730 | May 23, 1982 | Götzis, Austria |

=== Results ===
| Rank | Athlete | Decathlon | | | | | | | | | | Points |
| Rank | Athlete | 1 | 2 | 3 | 4 | 5 | 6 | 7 | 8 | 9 | 10 | Points |
|---|---|---|---|---|---|---|---|---|---|---|---|---|
| 1 | Robert Změlík (TCH) | 10,62 | 8.02 | 13.93 | 2.05 | 48,73 | 13,84 | 44.44 | 4.90 | 61.26 | 4.24,83 | 8627 |
| 2 | Eduard Hämäläinen (BLR) | 10,84 | 7.39 | 15.07 | 2.08 | 48,61 | 14,60 | 48.68 | 5.00 | 59.98 | 4.31,29 | 8483 |
| 3 | Michael Smith (CAN) | 10,70 | 7.34 | 15.43 | 2.08 | 47,05 | 14,44 | 44.40 | 4.60 | 63.62 | 4.40,10 | 8409 |
| 4 | Frank Müller (GER) | 10,92 | 7.35 | 14.44 | 1.96 | 48,27 | 14,22 | 43.82 | 4.60 | 63.10 | 4.27,36 | 8220 |
| 5 | Paul Meier (GER) | 10,75 | 7.47 | 15.05 | 2.05 | 48,05 | 14,86 | 43.84 | 4.70 | 57.24 | 4.47,46 | 8153 |
| 6 | Robert de Wit (NED) | 10,97 | 6.95 | 16.02 | 1.96 | 49,40 | 14,53 | 49.00 | 4.60 | 62.74 | 4.37,36 | 8153 |
| 7 | Viktor Radchenko (UKR) | 11,25 | 7.12 | 16.07 | 1.99 | 50,06 | 14,63 | 43.96 | 5.10 | 65.82 | 4.47,92 | 8148 |
| 8 | Gernot Kellermayr (AUT) | 10,55 | 7.67 | 14.41 | 1.96 | 48,32 | 14,18 | 42.32 | 4.70 | 54.50 | 4.46,48 | 8131 |
| 9 | Sándor Munkácsi (HUN) | 10,94 | 7.19 | 12.95 | 2.02 | 48,57 | 14,42 | 40.32 | 4.80 | 56.22 | 4.22,04 | 8021 |
| 10 | Norbert Lampe (GER) | 10,64 | 7.25 | 13.28 | 1.93 | 49,02 | 14,89 | 44.64 | 4.60 | 59.64 | 4.25,88 | 8016 |
| 11 | Stefan Schmid (GER) | 10,81 | 7.25 | 13.50 | 1.93 | 49,49 | 14,65 | 42.92 | 4.60 | 66.44 | 4.34,10 | 8012 |
| 12 | William Motti (FRA) | 11,49 | 7.18 | 16.25 | 2.11 | 51,89 | 15,43 | 48.94 | 4.70 | 67.36 | 5.10,97 | 7927 |
| 13 | Michael Arnold (AUT) | 10,82 | 7.59 | 13.40 | 1.96 | 50,14 | 15,09 | 41.32 | 4.30 | 54.36 | 4.36,13 | 7715 |
| 14 | Beat Gähwiler (SUI) | 11,45 | 7.20 | 13.78 | 1.87 | 50,24 | 15,29 | 42.34 | 4.70 | 56.76 | 4.23,03 | 7657 |
| 15 | Alper Kasapoğlu (TUR) | 11,00 | 7.09 | 13.72 | 1.93 | 50,55 | 14,58 | 40.98 | 4.50 | 49.68 | 4.41,16 | 7538 |
| 16 | Lars Warming (DEN) | 11,34 | 7.07 | 13.80 | 1.90 | 49,12 | 14,80 | 41.36 | 4.60 | 49.40 | 4.39,76 | 7520 |
| 17 | Bart Goodell (USA) | 11,15 | 6.88 | 15.09 | 1.93 | 50,74 | 14,81 | 45.68 | 4.70 | 60.92 | 5.41,50 | 7497 |
| 18 | Thorsten Dauth (GER) | 10,63 | 7.13 | 16.02 | 1.99 | 48,33 | 14,30 | 43.56 | 4.40 | 56.68 | — | 7421 |
| 19 | René Schmidheiny (SUI) | 11,49 | 6.94 | 14.50 | 1.93 | 51,60 | 15,30 | 42.00 | 4.40 | 60.76 | 4.49,27 | 7417 |
| 21 | Fabrizio Rovini (ITA) | 11,43 | 7.05 | 12.87 | 2.05 | 52,93 | 16,63 | 38.06 | 4.60 | 46.70 | 4.52,05 | 7011 |
| 20 | Gerhard Röser (AUT) | 11,31 | 7.18 | 13.40 | 1.81 | 51,43 | 15,40 | 38.14 | 4.20 | 53.90 | 4.47,04 | 7114 |
| — | Christian Schenk (GER) | 11,40 | 7.62 | 15.38 | 2.23 | 49,60 | 15,18 | 49.68 | 4.90 | NM | — | DNF |
| — | Mikhail Medved (UKR) | 11,12 | 7.36 | 16.13 | 2.05 | 50,21 | 14,59 | 46.82 | 4.90 | NM | — | DNF |
| — | Erwin Reiterer (AUT) | 11,24 | 7.47 | NM | 2.07 | NM | NM | 37.52 | 4.40 | DNS | — | DNF |
| — | Martin Krenn (AUT) | 11,63 | 6.72 | DNS | — | — | — | — | — | — | — | DNF |

== Women's heptathlon ==
=== Schedule ===
May 30
1. 100 m hurdles
2. High Jump
3. Shot Put
4. 200 m

May 31
5. Long Jump
6. Javelin Throw
7. 800 m

=== Records ===
| World Record | Jackie Joyner-Kersee (USA) | 7291 | September 24, 1988 | Seoul, South Korea |
| Event Record | Jackie Joyner-Kersee (USA) | 6841 | May 25, 1986 | Götzis, Austria |

== See also ==
- Athletics at the 1992 Summer Olympics – Men's decathlon
- Athletics at the 1992 Summer Olympics – Women's heptathlon
- 1992 Decathlon Year Ranking
