= Athletics at the 1992 Summer Olympics – Men's decathlon =

Men's decathlon at the Games of the XXV Olympiad
- Pictogram of athletics
- Venues: Estadi Olimpíc de Montjuïc
- Dates: 2–3 August
- Competitors: 36 from 24 nations
- Winning result: 8611

Medalists
1st place, gold medalist(s)		Robert Změlík; Czechoslovakia
2nd place, silver medalist(s)		Antonio Peñalver; Spain
3rd place, bronze medalist(s)		Dave Johnson; United States

These are the official results of the Men's Decathlon competition at the 1992 Summer Olympics in Barcelona, Spain. There were a total number of 36 participating athletes, with eight competitors who didn't finish the competition.

== Medalists ==
Gold	Robert Změlík; Czechoslovakia
Silver	Antonio Peñalver; Spain
Bronze	Dave Johnson; United States

== Schedule ==
August 5, 1992
1. 100 m
2. Long Jump
3. Shot Put
4. High Jump
5. 400 m

August 6, 1992
6. 110 m hurdles
7. Discus Throw
8. Pole Vault
9. Javelin Throw
10. 1,500 m

== Records ==
Standing records prior to the 1992 Summer Olympics
World Record	Daley Thompson (GBR)	8847	August 9, 1984	Los Angeles, United States
Olympic Record	Daley Thompson (GBR)	8847	August 9, 1984	Los Angeles, United States

== Results ==
The highest mark recorded in each event is highlighted in yellow. These marks were split between nine competitors with the gold medallist claiming two of them.

Rank	Athlete	Decathlon										Points
Rank	Athlete	100	LJ	SP	HJ	400	110mH	DT	PV	JT	1500	Points
1st place, gold medalist(s)	Robert Změlík (TCH)	10.78	7.87	14.53	2.06	48.65	13.95	45.00	5.10	59.06	4:27.21	8611
2nd place, silver medalist(s)	Antonio Peñalver (ESP)	11.09	7.54	16.50	2.06	49.66	14.58	49.68	4.90	58.64	4:38.02	8412
3rd place, bronze medalist(s)	Dave Johnson (USA)	11.16	7.33	15.28	2.00	49.76	14.76	49.12	5.10	62.86	4:36.63	8309
4	Dezső Szabó (HUN)	11.09	7.42	13.73	1.97	48.24	14.86	39.22	5.30	59.14	4:19.96	8199
5	Rob Muzzio (USA)	11.36	6.94	16.02	2.00	50.00	14.75	50.74	4.90	61.64	4:31.52	8195
6	Paul Meier (GER)	10.75	7.54	15.34	2.15	48.33	15.22	42.14	4.60	55.44	4:38.21	8192
7	William Motti (FRA)	11.42	7.13	15.44	2.12	50.44	15.02	50.58	4.70	67.60	4:48.69	8164
8	Ramil Ganiyev (EUN)	10.97	7.49	14.35	2.12	49.30	14.78	45.08	4.90	54.70	4:42.20	8160
9	Sten Ekberg (SWE)	11.11	7.02	14.32	2.03	48.91	14.97	45.76	4.90	62.22	4:29.11	8136
10	Robert de Wit (NED)	11.09	7.02	15.48	2.00	49.24	14.89	48.34	4.80	61.36	4:41.39	8109
11	Gernot Kellermayr (AUT)	10.49	7.53	14.56	1.91	47.91	14.64	45.06	4.80	53.74	4:52.56	8076
12	Viktor Radchenko (EUN)	11.30	7.33	15.21	1.97	50.62	14.78	44.84	4.90	62.56	4:33.49	8071
13	Frank Müller (GER)	10.95	7.25	13.55	1.97	47.98	14.51	42.56	4.60	61.84	4:29.19	8066
14	Andrei Nazarov (EST)	11.03	7.13	13.11	2.09	49.07	14.60	44.58	4.80	54.56	4:26.19	8052
15	Alain Blondel (FRA)	11.31	7.31	13.56	2.03	49.19	14.50	37.78	5.10	58.00	4:23.82	8031
16	Álvaro Burrell (ESP)	10.95	7.56	14.41	2.03	48.14	15.18	43.52	4.50	45.66	4:22.42	7952
17	Thorsten Dauth (GER)	10.80	7.30	15.29	1.97	48.33	14.76	44.70	4.50	52.94	4:44.91	7951
18	David Bigham (GBR)	11.14	7.26	12.56	1.94	47.73	14.94	37.42	4.50	60.52	4:27.42	7754
19	Dean Smith (AUS)	10.97	7.43	13.67	1.91	50.06	15.29	42.54	4.50	60.52	4:46.83	7703
20	Sándor Munkácsy (HUN)	11.13	7.28	12.56	1.91	48.69	14.81	41.22	4.40	52.90	4:18.62	7698
21	Beat Gähwiler (SUI)	11.56	7.07	12.92	1.88	50.08	15.17	43.26	4.60	58.82	4:12.07	7676
22	Francisco Javier Benet (ESP)	11.41	6.94	12.99	1.91	49.60	14.86	40.10	4.50	59.68	4:42.58	7484
23	Alper Kasapoğlu (TUR)	11.40	7.15	13.40	1.91	51.54	15.42	39.80	4.50	47.90	4:45.77	7205
24	Albert Miller (FIJ)	11.40	6.50	13.21	1.82	50.76	15.08	39.90	3.80	57.80	4:48.81	6971
25	Erich Momberger (PNG)	11.55	6.33	13.57	1.88	51.78	16.68	39.52	4.20	52.24	4:46.64	6780
26	Homelo Vi (TGA)	11.14	6.91	11.97	1.82	51.45	15.70	40.68	4.00	52.32	5:17.57	6768
27	Ibrahim Al-Matrooshi (UAE)	11.63	6.37	8.62	1.91	51.40	15.98	24.58	4.10	46.06	4:55.76	6124
28	Jorge Maradiaga (HON)	11.75	6.18	9.54	1.70	54.81	16.20	30.26	4.00	42.46	5:04.10	5746
—	Erki Nool (EST)	11.08	7.79	12.14	1.97	49.76	15.95	35.46	5.00	NM	DNS	DNF
—	Pedro da Silva (BRA)	11.21	7.00	14.71	2.06	49.55	14.70	NM	DNS	—	—	DNF
—	Aric Long (USA)	11.25	7.21	14.00	2.18	49.93	DSQ	45.76	DNS	—	—	DNF
—	Mike Smith (CAN)	11.02	6.83	15.03	2.00	50.04	DNS	—	—	—	—	DNF
—	Frank Dineen (IRL)	11.68	6.90	13.68	2.00	49.01	DNS	—	—	—	—	DNF
—	Christian Plaziat (FRA)	10.70	7.21	14.88	1.97	DNS	—	—	—	—	—	DNF
—	Eduard Hämäläinen (EUN)	11.10	7.15	14.78	2.00	DNS	—	—	—	—	—	DNF
—	Petri Keskitalo (FIN)	11.24	7.33	15.41	NM	—	—	—	—	—	—	DNF
—	Simon Poelman (NZL)	12.22	DNF	DNS	—	—	—	—	—	—	—	DNF

== See also ==
- 1991 Men's World Championship Decathlon
- 1992 Hypo-Meeting
- 1992 Decathlon Year Ranking
- 1993 Men's World Championship Decathlon
