= 1992 European Athletics Indoor Championships – Men's heptathlon =

The men's heptathlon at the 1992 European Athletics Indoor Championships was held in Palasport di Genova on 28 and 29 February. This was the first time that this event was held at the European Athletics Indoor Championships.

== Results ==
The highest mark recorded in each event is highlighted in yellow

Rank	Athlete	Nationality	60m	LJ	SP	HJ	60m H	PV	1000m	Points	Notes
1st place, gold medalist(s)	Christian Plaziat	France	6.83	7.58	14.43	2.13	7.97	5.20	2:40.17	6418	WR
2nd place, silver medalist(s)	Robert Změlík	Czechoslovakia	6.90	7.60	14.03	2.01	7.89	4.70	2:40.52	6118	NR
3rd place, bronze medalist(s)	Antonio Peñalver	Spain	7.16	7.02	16.29	2.07	8.10	4.80	2:39.83	6062	NR
4	Robert de Wit	Netherlands	7.08	7.14	15.55	1.95	8.15	5.00	2:38.91	6023	NR
5	Paul Meier	Germany	6.98	7.45	15.10	2.10	8.62	4.70	2:40.41	6023	
6	Lev Lobodin	Unified Team	6.99	7.13	14.66	2.01	7.98	4.90	2:46.10	5987	
7	Sándor Munkácsi	Hungary	7.12	7.44	12.75	1.98	8.25	4.60	2:35.45	5882	
8	Beat Gähwiler	Switzerland	7.42	7.09	13.24	1.95	8.57	4.80	2:35.11	5635	
9	Marco Baffi	Italy	7.19	6.92	12.73	1.98	8.72	4.60	2:45.41	5560	
	Frank Müller	Germany	6.93	NM	14.33	2.01	8.00	4.60	DNS	DNF	
	Vitaliy Kolpakov	Unified Team	7.17	6.90	14.26	1.95	DNF	DNS	–	DNF	
