= 1983 Hypo-Meeting =

The 9th edition of the annual Hypo-Meeting took place on May 28 and May 29, 1983, in Götzis, Austria. The track and field competition featured a decathlon (men) and a heptathlon (women) event.

== Men's Decathlon ==
=== Schedule ===
May 25
1. 100 m
2. Long Jump
3. Shot Put
4. High Jump
5. 400 m

May 26
6. 110 m hurdles
7. Discus Throw
8. Pole Vault
9. Javelin Throw
10. 1,500 m

=== Records ===
World Record	Daley Thompson (GBR)	8743	September 8, 1982	Athens, Greece
Event Record	Daley Thompson (GBR)	8730	May 23, 1982	Götzis, Austria

=== Results ===
Rank	Athlete	Decathlon										Points
Rank	Athlete	1	2	3	4	5	6	7	8	9	10	Points
1	Grigoriy Degtyaryev (URS)	11,12	7.52	16.00	2.08	49,77	14,74	50.38	4.90	59.22	4:25,20	8469
2	Konstantin Achapkin (URS)	11,00	7.53	15.32	1.99	49,17	14,33	46.06	4.80	63.00	4:57,27	8188
3	Dave Steen (CAN)	11,10	7.37	12.05	2.11	47,71	14,81	41.58	4.80	59.16	4:17,04	8155
4	Stephan Niklaus (SUI)											8139
5	Robert de Wit (NED)											7932
9	Philipp Eder (AUT)	11,31	6.82	13.06	1.90	50,28	15,51	40.04	4.20	56.70	4:28,90	7318
12	Wolfgang Spann (AUT)	11,58	6.46	13.83	1.85	50,24	14,74	40.06	4.00	63.54	4:38,92	7258
15	Haymo Polzer (AUT)	11,50	6.66	13.47	1.96	51,30	14,96	38.34	4.20	49.64	4:44,88	7097
16	Jürgen Mandl (AUT)	11,13	6.96	12.86	1.85	51,51	14,87	35.28	4.20	51.22	5:07,84	6940
—	Otto Petrovic (AUT)	11,90	6.46	12,76	1.99	52,42	15,77	36.02	3.80	61.82	—	DNF
—	Georg Werthner (AUT)	11,37	7.12	13,89	1.96	49,96	15,37	37.22	—	—	—	DNF

== Women's Heptathlon ==
=== Schedule ===
May 25
1. 100 m hurdles
2. High Jump
3. Shot Put
4. 200 m

May 26
5. Long Jump
6. Javelin Throw
7. 800 m

=== Records ===
World Record	Ramona Neubert (GDR)	6845	June 20, 1982	Halle, East Germany
Event Record	Jane Frederick (USA)	6438	May 23, 1982	Götzis, Austria
