= Athletics at the 1987 Summer Universiade – Men's decathlon =

Event in Zagreb, Croatia

The men's decathlon event at the 1987 Summer Universiade was held at the Stadion Maksimir in Zagreb on 16 and 17 July 1987.

== Results ==
Rank	Athlete	Nationality	100m	LJ	SP	HJ	400m	110m H	DT	PV	JT	1500m	Points	Notes
1st place, gold medalist(s)	Siegfried Wentz	West Germany	10.85	7.27	15.27	2.07	48.00	14.29	44.18	4.70	65.30	4:41.88	8348	
2nd place, silver medalist(s)	Jim Connolly	United States	11.13	7.08	14.75	2.10	49.90	15.04	42.78	4.60	69.44	4:47.25	8026	
3rd place, bronze medalist(s)	Patrick Gellens	France	11.08	7.25	13.39	1.95	49.22	15.86	43.12	4.90	52.62	4:23.99	7786	
4	Keith Robinson	United States	11.32	6.78	14.22	1.92	49.44	14.61	43.64	4.40	63.56	4:37.31	7723	
5	Gordon Orlikow	Canada	11.10	7.06	13.38	1.95	48.67	14.48	37.24	4.30	49.10	4:27.81	7549	
6	Saša Karan	Yugoslavia	11.35	6.95	12.40	2.04	50.05	15.12	43.24	4.20	53.50	4:22.59	7543	
7	Simon Shirley	Australia	11.42	7.32	11.94	2.01	49.25	15.52	33.58	4.40	60.84	4:25.02	7507	
8	Rainer Sonnesburg	West Germany	11.18	7.00	15.39	1.92	50.53	14.83	43.58	3.80	54.96	4:42.46	7467	
9	Goran Kabić	Yugoslavia	11.68	6.99	13.30	2.04	52.86	14.94	38.48	4.10	64.30	4:35.94	7385	
10	Morten Blumensaadt	Denmark											6777	
11	Francisco Aledo	Spain											6709	
12	Carlos Cunha	Portugal	12.61	5.59	11.14	1.83	54.78	16.79	30.80	3.60	62.04	4:33.24	5978	
	Dariusz Grad	Poland	10.95	7.02	13.65	2.01	49.35						DNF	
	Stuart Andrews	Australia	11.12	7.05	13.60	1.86							DNF	
	Alfredo Mayen	Mexico											DNF	
	René Schmidheiny	Switzerland											DNF	
	Katsuhiko Matsuda	Japan											DNF	
	Walid El-Ghotmi	Lebanon											DNF	
	Jihad Salame	Lebanon											DNF	
	Gernot Kellermayr	Austria											DNF	
