= 1995 World Championships in Athletics – Men's decathlon =

These are the official results of the Men's Decathlon competition at the 1995 World Championships in Gothenburg, Sweden. There were a total number of 30 participating athletes, including nine non-finishers. The competition started on August 6, 1995, and ended a day later, on August 7, 1995.

== Medalists ==
Gold	Dan O'Brien; United States (USA)
Silver	Eduard Hämäläinen; Belarus (BLR)
Bronze	Mike Smith; Canada (CAN)

== Schedule ==
Sunday, August 6
1. 100 m
2. Long Jump
3. Shot Put
4. High Jump
5. 400 m

Monday, August 7
6. 110 m hurdles
7. Discus Throw
8. Pole Vault
9. Javelin Throw
10. 1,500 m

== Abbreviations ==
DNS	did not start
DSQ	disqualified
NM	no mark
WR	world record
AR	area record
NR	national record
PB	personal best
SB	season best

== Records ==
Standing records prior to the 1995 World Athletics Championships
World Record	Dan O'Brien (USA)	8891	September 5, 1992	Talence, France
Event Record	Dan O'Brien (USA)	8817	August 20, 1993	Stuttgart, Germany

== Results ==
The highest mark recorded in each event is highlighted in yellow. These marks were split between seven competitors with the gold medallist claiming the high jump mark.

Rank	Athlete	Decathlon										Points
Rank	Athlete	1	2	3	4	5	6	7	8	9	10	Points
1st place, gold medalist(s)	Dan O'Brien (USA)	10.57	7.55	14.82	2.13	47.81	13.78	46.92	5.20	62.90	4:52.52	8695
2nd place, silver medalist(s)	Eduard Hämäläinen (BLR)	10.90	7.31	15.71	1.95	47.05	13.73	49.96	5.10	55.88	4:41.01	8489
3rd place, bronze medalist(s)	Mike Smith (CAN)	10.93	7.13	16.78	1.98	48.11	14.53	50.84	4.80	64.46	4:43.06	8419
4	Erki Nool (EST)	10.71	7.83	13.55	1.98	48.22	15.21	40.40	5.40	62.70	4:48.35	8268
5	Tomáš Dvořák (CZE)	11.09	7.48	15.18	1.98	49.11	13.95	43.36	4.60	62.98	4:31.31	8236
6	Christian Plaziat (FRA)	10.93	7.27	14.29	2.04	48.60	14.12	42.76	5.00	55.30	4:32.33	8206
7	Lev Lobodin (RUS)	10.93	7.20	15.72	2.04	48.92	13.98	45.34	4.60	55.74	4:36.23	8196
8	Chris Huffins (USA)	10.34	7.85	14.46	1.98	48.10	14.25	43.80	4.60	57.38	5:03.48	8193
9	Sébastien Levicq (FRA)	11.22	7.16	13.91	2.01	50.20	14.57	41.82	5.30	62.96	4:30.62	8136
10	Andrei Nazarov (EST)	10.95	7.35	13.34	2.07	49.46	14.23	43.42	4.80	58.94	4:41.39	8088
11	Indrek Kaseorg (EST)	11.44	7.13	14.26	2.01	48.59	14.32	42.56	4.50	60.86	4:16.99	8042
12	Alex Kruger (GBR)	11.19	7.14	14.43	2.10	50.08	14.82	42.98	4.80	57.30	4:33.28	7993
13	Simon Poelman (NZL)	11.04	7.13	15.59	1.95	50.66	14.44	44.24	4.80	56.28	4:36.34	7969
14	Robert Změlík (CZE)	11.01	7.22	14.35	1.95	50.90	14.15	41.00	5.00	59.06	4:39.64	7963
15	Jan Poděbradský (CZE)	10.75	6.99	13.53	1.83	46.90	14.21	40.98	4.70	50.96	4:12.52	7961
16	Henrik Dagård (SWE)	10.66	7.25	15.02	1.80	47.53	14.02	43.24	4.50	57.06	4:56.59	7899
17	Mirko Spada (SUI)	11.37	6.69	15.66	1.86	49.99	14.48	45.62	4.50	58.08	4:31.19	7744
18	Rolf Schläfli (SUI)	11.15	6.74	13.91	1.89	47.86	15.06	40.28	4.30	60.42	4:33.82	7602
19	Valeriy Belousov (RUS)	11.21	7.04	13.70	2.13	49.86	14.18	41.56	—	62.42	4:33.55	7235
—	Ramil Ganiyev (UZB)	10.94	7.07	14.52	2.07	48.45	DSQ	43.60	5.20	50.00	—	DNF
—	Sebastian Chmara (POL)	11.53	7.30	14.03	2.07	DSQ	14.68	40.04	4.80	49.16	—	DNF
—	Jón Arnar Magnússon (ISL)	10.72	7.29	14.64	1.89	DSQ	14.14	41.46	4.40	—	—	DNF
—	Brian Brophy (USA)	11.30	7.10	15.07	2.04	49.90	DNF	49.08	—	—	—	DNF
—	Petri Keskitalo (FIN)	11.05	7.57	15.04	1.86	50.68	DSQ	43.44	—	—	—	DNF
—	Rojs Piziks (LAT)	11.55	6.99	13.63	1.98	51.35	15.08	—	—	—	—	DNF
—	Michael Kohnle (GER)	11.24	7.49	15.35	1.98	DSQ	—	—	—	—	—	DNF
—	Alain Blondel (FRA)	11.14	NM	13.88	1.92	—	—	—	—	—	—	DNF
—	Thorsten Dauth (GER)	11.10	6.72	15.16	1.86	—	—	—	—	—	—	DNF
—	Antonio Peñalver (ESP)	11.26	7.18	15.77	—	—	—	—	—	—	—	DNF
—	Paul Meier (GER)	11.51	7.11	14.33	—	—	—	—	—	—	—	DNF

== See also ==
- 1994 Men's European Championships Decathlon
- 1995 Hypo-Meeting
- 1995 Décastar
- 1995 Decathlon Year Ranking
- 1996 Men's Olympic Decathlon
