= 1994 European Athletics Indoor Championships – Men's heptathlon =

The men's heptathlon event at the 1994 European Athletics Indoor Championships was held in Palais Omnisports de Paris-Bercy on 12 and 13 March.

== Results ==
The highest mark recorded in each event is highlighted in yellow

| Rank | Athlete | Nationality | 60m | LJ | SP | HJ | 60m H | PV | 1000m | Points | Notes |
|---|---|---|---|---|---|---|---|---|---|---|---|
| 1st place, gold medalist(s) | Christian Plaziat | France | 6.96 | 7.74 | 14.30 | 2.10 | 7.87 | 5.00 | 2:45.98 | 6268 | |
| 2nd place, silver medalist(s) | Henrik Dagård | Sweden | 6.84 | 7.30 | 15.61 | 1.98 | 7.91 | 4.80 | 2:44.21 | 6119 | |
| 3rd place, bronze medalist(s) | Alain Blondel | France | 7.12 | 7.24 | 13.85 | 1.95 | 8.00 | 5.30 | 2:36.77 | 6084 | |
| 4 | Tomáš Dvořák | Czech Republic | 7.00 | 7.53 | 15.52 | 1.98 | 7.95 | 4.60 | 2:42.48 | 6061 | |
| 5 | Erki Nool | Estonia | 6.95 | 7.66 | 12.80 | 1.98 | 8.48 | 5.30 | 2:50.42 | 5945 | |
| 6 | Sándór Munkácsi | Hungary | 7.04 | 7.44 | 13.58 | 1.95 | 8.04 | 4.70 | 2:37.27 | 5944 | |
| 7 | Indrek Kaseorg | Estonia | 7.21 | 7.23 | 12.20 | 2.07 | 8.08 | 4.80 | 2:36.54 | 5888 | |
| 8 | Marcel Dost | Netherlands | 7.24 | 7.30 | 13.17 | 1.98 | 8.27 | 5.00 | 2:50.45 | 5734 | |
| 9 | Michael Kohnle | Germany | 7.08 | 7.21 | 14.19 | 1.92 | 8.20 | 4.80 | 3:03.25 | 5603 | |
| 10 | Javier Benet | Spain | 7.28 | 6.98 | 12.67 | 1.89 | 8.10 | 4.80 | 2:51.63 | 5501 | |
| | Vitaliy Kolpakov | Ukraine | 7.05 | 7.55 | 14.77 | 2.07 | 7.99 | NM | DNS | DNF | |
| | Lev Lobodin | Ukraine | 6.93 | 7.48 | 14.35 | 2.01 | 7.82 | NM | DNS | DNF | |
| | Álvaro Burrell | Spain | 7.03 | 6.63 | 14.38 | 1.95 | 8.32 | NM | DNS | DNF | |
| | Alex Kruger | Great Britain | 7.17 | 7.23 | 14.38 | 2.07 | DNS | – | – | DNF | |
