= John Crist =

John Crist may refer to:

- John Crist (decathlete) (born 1954), American former decathlete
- John Crist (comedian) (born 1984), American comedian
