= Piziks =

Piziks is a surname of Latvian origin. Notable people with that name include:

- Arvis Piziks (born 1969), Latvian cyclist
- Rojs Piziks (born 1971), Latvian decathlete and high jumper
- Steven Piziks (AKA Steven Harper, active from 1996), American author
