= Xhonneux =

Xhonneux is a Belgian surname. Notable people with the surname include:

- Frédéric Xhonneux (born 1983), Belgian track and field athlete
- Henri Xhonneux (1945–1995), Belgian film director and screenwriter
