= Josef Karas (athlete) =

Czech model and decathlete (born 1978)

Personal information
- Full name: Josef Karas
- Born: 20 August 1978 (age 48) Olomouc, Czechoslovakia, now Czech Republic
- Height: 1.91 m (6 ft 3 in)
- Weight: 90.0 kg (198.4 lb; 14.17 st)

Josef Karas
- Beauty pageant titleholder
- Hair color: Dark blond/Brown
- Eye color: Blue
- Major competitions: Mister Czech Republic 2010 (winner); Mister World 2010 (1st runner-up)

Josef Karas (born 20 August 1978 in Olomouc, Czechoslovakia, now Czech Republic) is a Czech male decathlete. He previously represented Canada. He set his personal best score (7922 points) in the men's decathlon on 20 June 2007 in Kladno. Karas is a two-time national champion in the men's decathlon (2005 and 2006).

== Achievements ==
Year	Competition	Venue	Position	Event	Notes
Representing Canada
2002	NACAC U-25 Championships	San Antonio, Texas, United States	2nd	Decathlon	6927 pts
Representing the Czech Republic
2006	European Championships	Gothenburg, Sweden	14th	Decathlon	7669 pts
2007	European Indoor Championships	Birmingham, England	12th	Heptathlon	5229 pts
2007	Hypo-Meeting	Götzis, Austria	—	Decathlon	DNF
2007	World Championships	Osaka, Japan	20th	Decathlon	7625 pts
2008	Hypo-Meeting	Götzis, Austria	—	Decathlon	DNF
