= Rolf Schläfli =

Swiss decathlete

Rolf Schläfli (born March 15, 1971) is a retired male decathlete from Switzerland. He set his personal best score (8019 points) at the 2003 Hypo-Meeting in Götzis, Austria. Schläfli is a two-time national champion in the men's decathlon (1995 and 1998).

== Achievements ==
| Year | Competition | Venue | Position | Event | Notes |
Representing Switzerland
| 1994 | European Championships | Helsinki, Finland | — | Decathlon | DNF |
| 1995 | Hypo-Meeting | Götzis, Austria | 21st | Decathlon | 7821 pts |
| 1995 | World Championships | Gothenburg, Sweden | 18th | Decathlon | 7602 pts |
| 1998 | European Championships | Budapest, Hungary | 17th | Decathlon | 7778 pts |
| 2002 | Hypo-Meeting | Götzis, Austria | 10th | Decathlon | 7895 pts |
| 2002 | European Championships | Munich, Germany | 15th | Decathlon | 7543 pts |
| 2003 | Hypo-Meeting | Götzis, Austria | 4th | Decathlon | 8019 pts |
