= Massimo Bertocchi =

Canadian decathlete

Massimo Bertocchi (born September 27, 1985, in North York, Ontario) is a male decathlete from Canada.

Bertocchi grew up in Maple, Ontario.

Bertocchi set his personal best score (8014 points) in the men's decathlon on July 4, 2008, in Windsor. He is a three-time national champion in the men's decathlon: 2006, 2007 and 2008.

== Achievements ==
Year	Competition	Venue	Position	Event	Notes
2008	Hypo-Meeting	Götzis, Austria	10th	Decathlon	7959 pts
2008	Olympic Games	Beijing, China	19th	Decathlon	7714 pts
2009	Jeux de la Francophonie	Beirut, Lebanon	1st	Decathlon	8053 pts (W)
