= Beat Gähwiler =

Beat Gähwiler may refer to:

- Beat Gähwiler (decathlete) (born 1965), Swiss decathlete
- Beat H. Gähwiler (born 1940), Swiss professor
