= Jānis Karlivāns =

Latvian decathlete

Jānis Karlivāns (born 2 June 1982) is a Latvian decathlete. He was born in Cēsis. His personal best result is 8271 points, achieved in June 2007 in Götzis. Currently it's also Latvian record.

== Achievements ==
Year	Competition	Venue	Position	Event	Notes
Representing Latvia
2003	European U23 Championships	Bydgoszcz, Poland	15th (q)	Long jump	7.46 m (wind: 0.5 m/s)
2004	Olympic Games	Athens, Greece	25th	Decathlon	7583 pts
2007	European Indoor Championships	Birmingham, England	10th	Heptathlon	5698 pts
2007	Hypo-Meeting	Götzis, Austria	6th	Decathlon	8271 pts
2008	Olympic Games	Beijing, PR China	—	Decathlon	DNF
