= Michele Rüfenacht =

Swiss decathlete

Michele Rüfenacht (born September 15, 1959) is a retired decathlete from Switzerland, who finished in tenth place (7924 points) at the 1984 Summer Olympics in Los Angeles, California. He is a three-time national champion (1980, 1984 and 1987) in the men's decathlon.

== Achievements ==
Year	Competition	Venue	Position	Notes
Representing Switzerland
1984	Hypo-Meeting	Götzis, Austria	21st	Decathlon
