= Stephan Niklaus =

Swiss decathlete

Stephan Niklaus (born 17 April 1958) is a retired male decathlete from Switzerland. A member of the Leichtathletikclub Basel he set his personal best (8337 points) on 3 July 1983 at a meet in Lausanne, which still stands at the Swiss national record. Niklaus won three national titles in the men's decathlon during his career: 1981, 1982 and 1983.

== Achievements ==
Year	Competition	Venue	Position	Notes
Representing Switzerland
1980	Olympic Games	Moscow, Soviet Union	12th	Decathlon
1983	World Championships	Helsinki, Finland	5th	Decathlon
1984	Hypo-Meeting	Götzis, Austria	8th	Decathlon
1986	Hypo-Meeting	Götzis, Austria	14th	Decathlon
