= Mikael Olander =

Swedish decathlete

Mikael Olander (born 11 June 1963) is a retired decathlete from Sweden, who finished in 17th place (7869 points) at the 1988 Summer Olympics in Seoul, South Korea. He is a one-time national champion (1986) in the men's decathlon.

Olander was a member of the Louisiana State University track and field team.

== Achievements ==
Year	Competition	Venue	Position	Notes
Representing Sweden
1984	Hypo-Meeting	Götzis, Austria	20th	Decathlon
