= Sándor Munkácsy =

Hungarian decathlete

Personal information
- Nationality: Hungarian
- Born: 24 July 1969 (age 55); Gödöllő, Hungary

Sport
- Sport: Athletics
- Event: Decathlon

Sándor Munkácsy (born 24 July 1969) is a Hungarian athlete. He competed in the men's decathlon at the 1992 Summer Olympics.
