= Jan Poděbradský =

Jan Poděbradský (born March 1, 1974, in Prague) is a retired male decathlete from the Czech Republic, who also competed in the men's 400 metres during his career. He set his personal best (8314 points) in the decathlon on June 4, 2000, in Arles, France. Poděbradský is a two-time national champion (2002 and 2004) in the decathlon.

== Achievements ==
Year	Competition	Venue	Position	Event	Notes
Representing Czech Republic
1995	World Championships	Gothenburg, Sweden	15th	Decathlon	7961
