= Rišardas Malachovskis =

Soviet-Lithuanian decathlete (born 1965)

Rišardas Malachovskis (born April 28, 1965) is a retired male decathlete who represented the Soviet Union and later Lithuania. He set his personal best score (8437 points) on July 2, 1988 at a meet in Minsk. He won the Lithuanian national title in 1991.
