= 2007 European Athletics Indoor Championships – Men's heptathlon =

The Men's heptathlon event at the 2007 European Athletics Indoor Championships was held on March 3–4.

== Medalists ==
Gold	Silver	Bronze
Roman Šebrle; Czech Republic	Aleksandr Pogorelov; Russia	Andrei Krauchanka; Belarus

== Results ==
The highest mark recorded in each event is highlighted in yellow

Rank	Athlete	Nationality	60m	LJ	SP	HJ	60m H	PV	1000m	Points	Notes
1st place, gold medalist(s)	Roman Šebrle	Czech Republic	7.06	7.79	16.12	2.02	8.22	5.00	2:45.84	6196	SB
2nd place, silver medalist(s)	Aleksandr Pogorelov	Russia	7.01	7.64	15.21	2.08	8.14	5.10	2:55.47	6127	SB
3rd place, bronze medalist(s)	Andrei Krauchanka	Belarus	7.04	7.67	12.46	2.11	8.04	4.90	2:41.85	6127	SB
4	Dennis Leyckes	Germany	6.99	6.85	12.76	1.99	8.14	5.40	2:40.43	5962	PB
5	Jacob Minah	Germany	6.92	7.41	13.53	1.99	8.38	4.90	2:45.80	5896	PB
6	Romain Barras	France	7.21	7.02	14.88	1.96	8.17	5.00	2:41.43	5883	SB
7	Rudy Bourguignon	France	7.09	7.04	14.39	1.87	8.46	5.20	2:48.37	5737	
8	François Gourmet	Belgium	6.93	7.00	13.67	1.90	8.44	5.00	2:47.30	5721	
9	Frédéric Xhonneux	Belgium	7.23	7.03	12.92	1.99	8.52	4.80	2:34.33	5720	PB
10	Jānis Karlivāns	Latvia	7.22	7.53	15.11	1.99	8.44	4.30	2:48.27	5698	
11	Álvaro Contreras	Spain	7.21	7.00	12.48	2.05	8.68	4.40	2:34.96	5588	
12	Josef Karas	Czech Republic	7.07	7.23	13.92	1.90	8.60	4.40	3:18.06	5229	
	Madis Kallas	Estonia	7.07	7.23	14.61	1.99	8.24	–	–	DNF	
	Aleksey Drozdov	Russia	7.19	7.07	15.01	1.96	–	–	–	DNF	
	Eugène Martineau	Netherlands	7.09	6.27	–	–	–	–	–	DNF	
