= Ibrahim Al-Matrooshi =

Emirati decathlete

Personal information
- Nationality: Emirati
- Born: 1 July 1970 (age 55)

Sport
- Sport: Athletics
- Event: Decathlon
Medal record
Men's athletics
Representing the United Arab Emirates
Asian Championships
Bronze medal – third place	1995 Jakarta	Decathlon

Ibrahim Al-Matrooshi (born 1 July 1970) is an Emirati athlete. He competed in the men's decathlon at the 1992 Summer Olympics.
