= Christian Plaziat =

French decathlete

Medal record

Men's athletics

Representing France

World Indoor Championships
Gold medal – first place	1995 Barcelona	Heptathlon

European Championships
Gold medal – first place	1990 Split	Decathlon

European Indoor Championships
Gold medal – first place	1992 Genoa	Heptathlon
Gold medal – first place	1994 Paris	Heptathlon

Christian Plaziat (born 28 October 1963 in Lyon) is a retired French decathlete. During his career he won the European Championships, the European Indoor Championships and the World Indoor Championships.

== Achievements ==
Year	Competition	Venue	Position	Event	Notes
Representing France
1986	European Championships	Stuttgart, West Germany	7th	Decathlon	8196 pts
1986	Décastar	Talence, France	1st	Decathlon	7944 pts
1987	World Championships	Rome, Italy	4th	Decathlon	8307 pts
1988	Hypo-Meeting	Götzis, Austria	4th	Decathlon	8349 pts
1988	Olympic Games	Seoul, South Korea	5th	Decathlon	8272 pts
1988	Décastar	Talence, France	1st	Decathlon	8512 pts
1989	Hypo-Meeting	Götzis, Austria	1st	Decathlon	8485 pts
1989	Décastar	Talence, France	1st	Decathlon	8512 pts
1990	European Championships	Split, Yugoslavia	1st	Decathlon	8574 pts
1990	Décastar	Talence, France	1st	Decathlon	8525 pts
1991	World Championships	Tokyo, Japan	9th	Decathlon	8122 pts
1991	Décastar	Talence, France	1st	Decathlon	8456 pts
1992	European Indoor Championships	Genoa, Italy	1st	Heptathlon	6418 pts
1992	Olympic Games	Barcelona, Spain	DNF	Decathlon	—
1993	Hypo-Meeting	Götzis, Austria	8th	Decathlon	8107 pts
1993	World Championships	Stuttgart, Germany	6th	Decathlon	8398 pts
1994	European Indoor Championships	Paris, France	1st	Heptathlon	6268 pts
1994	European Championships	Helsinki, Finland	4th	Decathlon	8127 pts
1995	World Indoor Championships	Barcelona, Spain	1st	Heptathlon	6246 pts
1995	Hypo-Meeting	Götzis, Austria	6th	Decathlon	8191 pts
1995	World Championships	Gothenburg, Sweden	6th	Decathlon	8206 pts
1996	Olympic Games	Atlanta, United States	11th	Decathlon	8282 pts
1997	World Indoor Championships	Paris, France	5th	Heptathlon	6106 pts

== See also ==
- Men's heptathlon world record progression

Records
Preceded by (West Germany) Siegfried Wentz	Men's heptathlon world record holder 15 February 1986 – 14 March 1993	Succeeded by (United States) Dan O'Brien
