= Dan O'Brien =

American decathlete

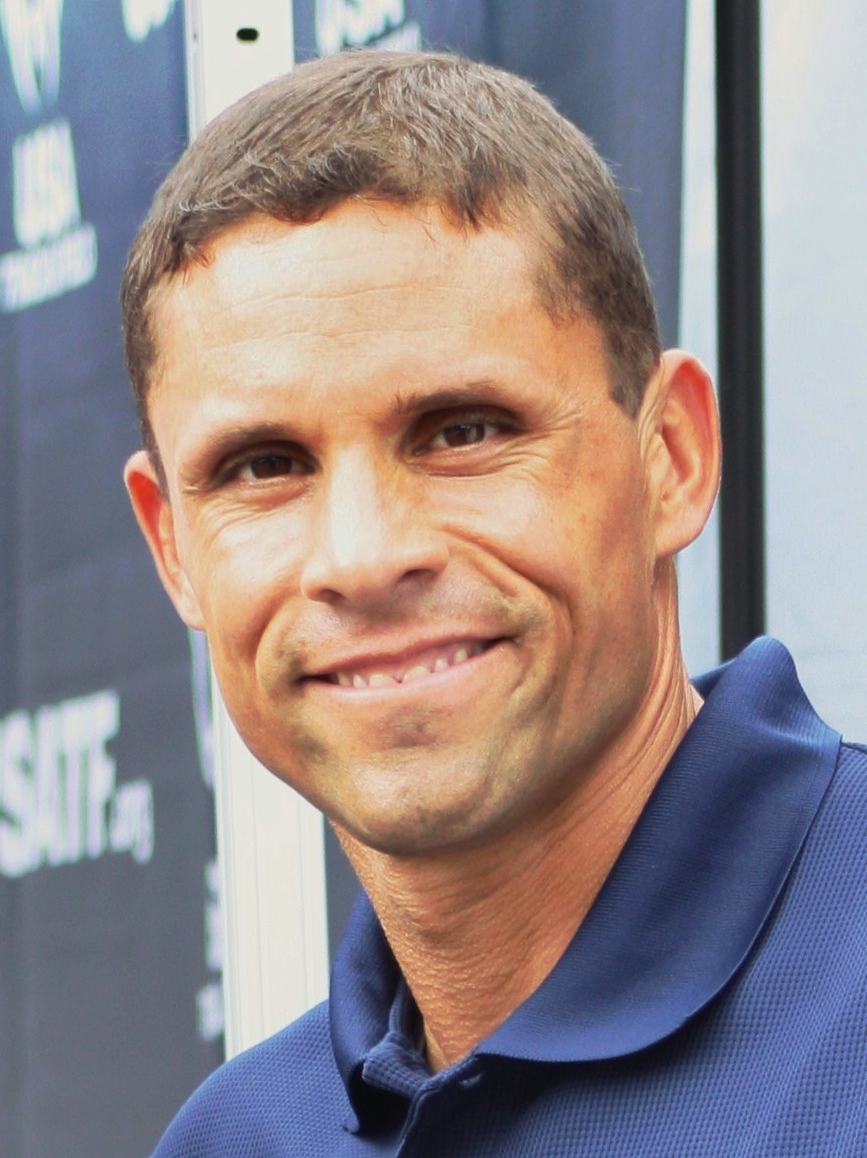
- O'Brien in 2009

Personal information
- Full name: Daniel Dion O'Brien
- Born: July 18, 1966 (age 60) Portland, Oregon, U.S.
- Height: 6 ft 2 in (188 cm)
- Weight: 185 lb (84 kg)
- Website: danobrien.com

Sport
- Country: United States
- Sport: Track & Field
- Event: Decathlon
- College team: University of Idaho
- Coached by: Mike Keller (UI), Rick Sloan (WSU)

Achievements and titles
- Personal bests: Decathlon: 8,891 (1992); Heptathlon: 6,476 (1993)
Medal record
Men's athletics
Representing the United States
Olympic Games
Gold medal – first place	1996 Atlanta	Decathlon
World Championships
Gold medal – first place	1991 Tokyo	Decathlon
Gold medal – first place	1993 Stuttgart	Decathlon
Gold medal – first place	1995 Gothenburg	Decathlon
World Indoor Championships
Gold medal – first place	1993 Toronto	Heptathlon

Daniel Dion O'Brien (born July 18, 1966) is an American former decathlete and Olympic gold medalist. He won the Olympic title in 1996, three consecutive world championships (1991, 1993, 1995), and set the world record in 1992.

== Early life ==
O'Brien was born in Portland, Oregon in 1966. He is of African American and Finnish heritage, and grew up as an adopted child in an Irish-American family in Klamath Falls. He attended Henley High School graduating in 1984. At the Oregon High School State Championships he led his team to a team runner-up finish with O'Brien scoring all points. He earned four individual gold medals winning the 110 meter high hurdles, 300 meter hurdles, long jump and 100 yard dash. He then attended the University of Idaho in Moscow, where he competed in track and field for the Vandals. After initially flunking out of the university and then incurring legal difficulties, O'Brien attended Spokane Falls Community College, a community college in Spokane, Washington in 1987–1988. He returned to the UI to compete for the Vandal track team, and complete his bachelor's degree.

O'Brien trained for his Olympic and world championships on the Palouse under Idaho's track coach Mike Keller, and Rick Sloan of Washington State in neighboring Pullman for the field events.

O'Brien competed at the U.S. Olympic Trials in 1988; after a fast time in the 100 meters, he was injured in the long jump and withdrew. He took second place at the Goodwill Games in Seattle in 1990, behind Dave Johnson.

== Career ==
=== Olympics ===
As the 1991 world champion, O'Brien entered the Olympic year of 1992 as the favorite to win gold in the decathlon in Barcelona and be proclaimed as the "world's greatest athlete." However, during the U.S. Olympic Trials at Tad Gormley Stadium in New Orleans in late June, O'Brien had a disaster in the eighth event, the pole vault. After passing at the first four (lower) heights, O'Brien entered the competition at 15 ft 9 in (4.80 m), and failed to clear the bar on all three attempts. As a result, he scored no points and dropped from first to eleventh place among the 24 decathletes. He did not make the Olympic team for Barcelona, but he continued to train for the competition held in France a few weeks after the Olympics ended.

O'Brien's "no height" in the pole vault was also a financial embarrassment for his main corporate sponsor, and for NBC television which was heavily promoting the upcoming Olympics. He appeared with U.S. rival Dave Johnson, the Goodwill Games champion, in a popular TV advertising campaign for Reebok. The series of commercials, entitled "Dan & Dave," were meant to build interest in Reebok and the decathletes, culminating in the Olympics in Barcelona. O'Brien's unexpected failure in New Orleans received considerable attention; Reebok adjusted by running new ads featuring him cheering on Dave, who went on to win the bronze medal.

O'Brien regrouped and set a world record of 8,891 points in early September in Talence, France. His marks were as follows: 100 meters in 10.43 seconds (with a tailwind); Long Jump 26 ft 6¼ in (8.08 m); Shot Put 54 ft 9¼ in (16.69 m); High Jump 6 ft 9½ in (2.07 m); 400 meters 48.51 seconds, for a first day total of 4,720 points; Day two 110 Meter High Hurdles in 13.98 seconds; Discus 159 ft 4 inches (48.56m); Pole Vault 16 ft 4¾ in (5.00 m); Javelin 205 ft 4 in (62.58m); 1,500 meter run in 4 minutes 42.10 seconds = total 8,891 points).

This stood as the world record until 1999, and the American record for nearly twenty years, until Ashton Eaton broke it in 2012 at the U.S. Olympic Trials in Eugene, Oregon. O'Brien was in attendance at Hayward Field and congratulated Eaton shortly after he completed the 1500 meters for a new world record of 9,039 points.

At the Olympics in Atlanta in 1996, O'Brien won the gold medal with 8,824 points, 118 ahead of runner-up Frank Busemann of Germany. After a break from competition, he won the Goodwill Games title in 1998, held east of New York City on Long Island, his eleventh consecutive win since 1992. A plantar fascia injury to his left foot in July 2000, shortly before the U.S. Olympic Trials, caused his withdrawal and he did not defend his title. Injuries continued and prevented his return to the Olympic trials in 2004.

== Personal bests ==
Information from World Athletics profile unless otherwise noted.

Outdoor

Individual events
Event	Performance	Location	Date
100 meters	10.70 (+1.8 m/s)	Modesto	May 8, 1999
100 meters	10.52 (+2.3 m/s)	Modesto	May 10, 1998
110 meters hurdles	13.47 (+0.0 m/s)	San Jose	May 27, 1995
Long jump	7.79 m (25 ft 6 1/2 in) (+0.0 m/s)	San Jose	May 27, 1995
Long jump	8.11 m (26 ft 7 1/4 in) (+2.3 m/s)	Modesto	May 11, 1991
High jump	2.00 m (6 ft 6 1/2 in)	Pullman	May 2, 1998
Pole vault	5.18 m (16 ft 11 3/4 in)	Reno	February 10, 1996
Shot put	14.94 m (49 ft 0 in)	Reno	February 10, 1996
Discus throw	55.07 m (180 ft 8 in)	Modesto	May 8, 1999
Javelin throw	63.58 m (208 ft 7 in)	Flagstaff	July 8, 2000

Combined events
Event	Performance	Location	Date	Points
Decathlon	—N/a	Talence	September 4–5, 1992	8,891 points
100 meters	10.32 (+1.7 m/s)	Atlanta	June 21, 1996	1,018 points
Long jump	8.08 m (26 ft 6 in) (+1.8 m/s)	Talence	September 4, 1992	1,081 points
Shot put	16.69 m (54 ft 9 in)	Talence	September 4, 1992	894 points
High jump	2.20 m (7 ft 2 1/2 in)	Saint Petersburg	July 28, 1994	992 points
400 meters	46.53	Tokyo	August 29, 1991	982 points
110 meters hurdles	13.67 (+0.4 m/s)	New York	July 20, 1998	1,018 points
Discus throw	53.60 m (175 ft 10 in)	Berkeley	June 20, 2002	946 points
Pole vault	5.20 m (17 ft 1/2 in)	Tokyo	August 30, 1991	972 points
Javelin throw	66.90 m (219 ft 5 3/4 in)	Atlanta	August 1, 1996	842 points
1500 meters	4:36.63	Seattle	July 25, 1990	702 points
Virtual Best Performance				9,447 points

Indoor

Individual events
Event	Performance	Location	Date
50 meters	6.63	Los Angeles	February 13, 1999
55 meters	7.26	San Diego	January 23, 1999
60 meters hurdles	7.68	Modesto	March 2, 1996
Long jump	7.73 m (25 ft 4 1/4 in)	Houston	February 3, 1996
Shot put	14.94 m (49 ft 0 in)	Reno	February 10, 1996
Pole vault	5.18 m (16 ft 11 3/4 in)	Reno	February 10, 1996

Combined events
Event	Performance	Location	Date	Points
Heptathlon	—N/a	Toronto	March 13–14, 1993	6,476 points
60 meters	6.67	Toronto	March 13, 1993	1,003 points
Long jump	7.94 m (26 ft 1/2 in)	Toronto	March 13, 1993	992 points
Shot put	16.02 m (52 ft 6 1/2 in)	Toronto	March 13, 1993	852 points
High jump	2.13 m (6 ft 11 3/4 in)	Toronto	March 13, 1993	925 points
60 meters hurdles	7.68	Toronto	March 14, 1993	1,064 points
Pole vault	5.20 m (17 ft 1/2 in)	Toronto	March 14, 1993	972 points
1000 meters	2:57.96	Toronto	March 14, 1993	684 points
Virtual Best Performance				6,476 points

== Retirement ==
O'Brien announced his retirement from the decathlon on July 8, 2004.

== Other athletics ==
O'Brien broke the world record for the fastest game of hopscotch on Chelsea Piers on May 7, 2009. He established a record of 81 seconds, breaking the old mark by two seconds.

Shortly following the 2010 MLB season, O'Brien began working with San Francisco Giants third baseman Pablo Sandoval, in an effort to help the struggling slugger lose weight.

== Modeling and product endorsements ==
In the late 1990s, Dan O'Brien appeared in ads for Italian designer Versace.

== Literature ==
On June 1, 2012, O'Brien released a book which was co-written with Brad Botkin, "Clearing Hurdles: The Quest to Be The World's Greatest Athlete" (ISBN 978-1935628088).

== Podcast ==
O'Brien and Dave Johnson are the subject of (and participants in) the ESPN Radio 30 for 30 podcast "The Trials of Dave and Dan"

== Personal life ==
In 1994, O'Brien was diagnosed with ADHD and prescribed Wellbutrin.

Since 1997, O'Brien has been a resident of the Phoenix area, having relocated from northern Idaho. He owns Gold Medal Acceleration, a gym in Scottsdale, is a volunteer track coach at ASU, and does commentary for track and field events on television.

== Honors and awards ==
O'Brien won the Olympic gold medal for decathlon at the 1996 Summer Olympics in Atlanta, and also won gold medals at the 1991, 1993, and 1995 World Championships in Athletics.

Shortly after his gold medal performance at the 1996 Olympics, O'Brien was honored with "Dan O'Brien Day" by the state of Idaho and a parade by the city of Moscow in mid-August.

O'Brien was inducted into the Oregon Sports Hall of Fame in 2005, along with Dave Johnson. He was inducted into the National Track and Field Hall of Fame in 2006, the University of Idaho Sports Hall of Fame with the large inaugural class of 2007, and the United States Olympic Hall of Fame in 2012.

A street in Klamath Falls was named for him 1996, and Henley High School honored O'Brien by renaming its football field after the athlete in 2010.

The University of Idaho's outdoor track and field venue was named for O'Brien in 1996. The complex underwent a $2.5 million renovation in 2011–12, and he was on hand in Moscow in May 2012 to rededicate it.

== See also ==
Records
Preceded by (United Kingdom) Daley Thompson	Men's Decathlon World Record Holder; September 5, 1992 – July 4, 1999	Succeeded by (Czech Republic) Tomáš Dvořák
Preceded by (France) Christian Plaziat	Men's heptathlon world record holder March 14, 1993 – March 13, 2010	Succeeded by (United States) Ashton Eaton
