= Viktor Radchenko =

Ukrainian decathlete

Viktor Radchenko (Ukrainian: Віктор Радченко; born May 11, 1968) is a retired decathlete from Ukraine. He competed at the 1992 Summer Olympics for the Unified team.

== Achievements ==
Year	Competition	Venue	Position	Notes
Representing Unified Team
1992	Olympic Games	Barcelona, Spain	12th	Decathlon
Representing Ukraine
1992	Hypo-Meeting	Götzis, Austria	7th	Decathlon
1993	Hypo-Meeting	Götzis, Austria	15th	Decathlon
