= Munehiro Kaneko =

Japanese decathlete

Munehiro Kaneko (Japanese: 金子宗弘; born June 6, 1968) is a retired male decathlete from Japan.

== International competitions ==
Representing Japan
Year	Competition	Venue	Position	Event	Notes
1990	Asian Games	Beijing, China	1st	Decathlon	7799
