= Rojs Piziks =

Latvian athlete

Rojs Piziks (born February 12, 1971, in Sigulda) is a retired male decathlete and high jumper from Latvia, who competed for his native country at the 1996 Summer Olympics in Atlanta, United States. He set his personal best score (8045 points) in the men's decathlon on June 16, 1996, at a meet in Riga. Piziks is a four-time national champion in the men's decathlon.

== Achievements ==
Year	Competition	Venue	Position	Event	Notes
Representing Latvia
1994	European Championships	Helsinki, Finland	21st	Decathlon	7118 points
1995	World Championships	Gothenburg, Sweden	DNF	Decathlon	—
1996	Olympic Games	Atlanta, United States	23rd	Decathlon	7994 points
1997	Hypo-Meeting	Götzis, Austria	14th	Decathlon	7882 points
1997	World Championships	Athens, Greece	DNF	Decathlon	—
