= Roman Hrabaň =

Czech athlete

Personal information
- Nationality: Czech
- Born: 28 June 1962 (age 62); Liberec, Czechoslovakia

Sport
- Sport: Athletics
- Event: Decathlon

Roman Hrabaň (born 28 June 1962) is a Czech athlete. He competed in the men's decathlon at the 1988 Summer Olympics. He also competed in the two-man and the four-man bobsleigh events at the 1992 Winter Olympics.

== See also ==
- List of athletes who competed in both the Summer and Winter Olympic games
