= Christian Gugler =

Swiss decathlete

Personal information
- Nationality: Swiss
- Born: 1 August 1960 (age 66) Aarau, Switzerland

Sport
- Sport: Athletics
- Event: Decathlon

Christian Gugler (born 1 August 1960) is a Swiss athlete. He competed in the men's decathlon at the 1988 Summer Olympics.
