= Marcel Dost =

Dutch decathlete

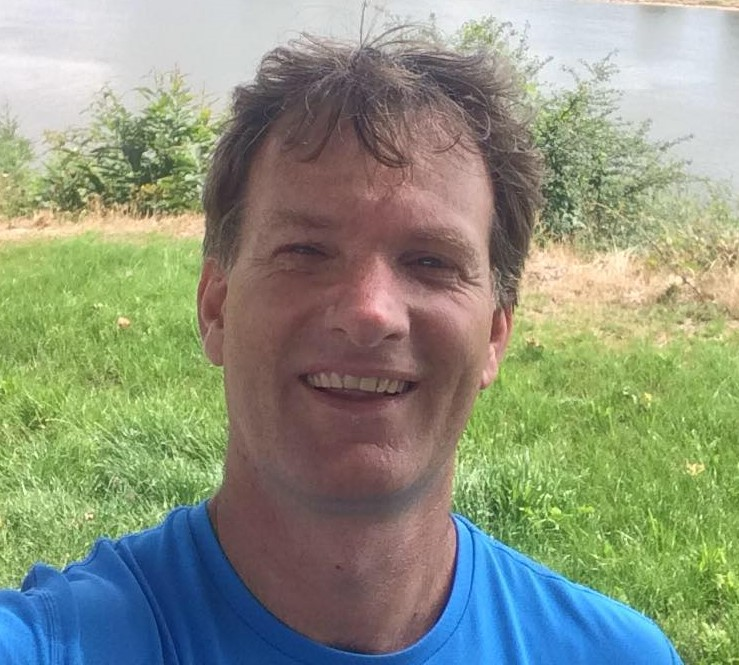

Personal information
- Born: 28 September 1969 (age 57) Zierikzee, Netherlands

Sport
- Sport: Decathlon
Medal record
Representing Netherlands
Summer Universiade
Bronze medal – third place	1997 Catania	Decathlon

Henk Marcel Dost (born 28 September 1969) is a retired decathlete from the Netherlands, who represented his native country at the 1996 Summer Olympics in Atlanta, United States. There he finished in 18th place in the men's decathlon competition, earning a total number of 8111 points. The other competitor from the Netherlands, Jack Rosendaal, ended up in 21st place.

Dost is the uncle of Sven Roosen, who participated in the 2024 Olympic Decathlon in Paris.

== Achievements ==
Year	Competition	Venue	Position	Event	Notes
Representing the Netherlands
1988	World Junior Championships	Sudbury, Canada	13th	Decathlon	6837 pts
1994	European Championships	Helsinki, Finland	18th	Decathlon	7547 pts
1996	Olympic Games	Atlanta, United States	18th	Decathlon	8111 pts
1997	Summer Universiade	Catania, Italy	3rd	Decathlon	7899 pts
1997	World Championships	Athens, Greece	14th	Decathlon	8040 pts
