= Frédéric Xhonneux =

Belgian decathlete

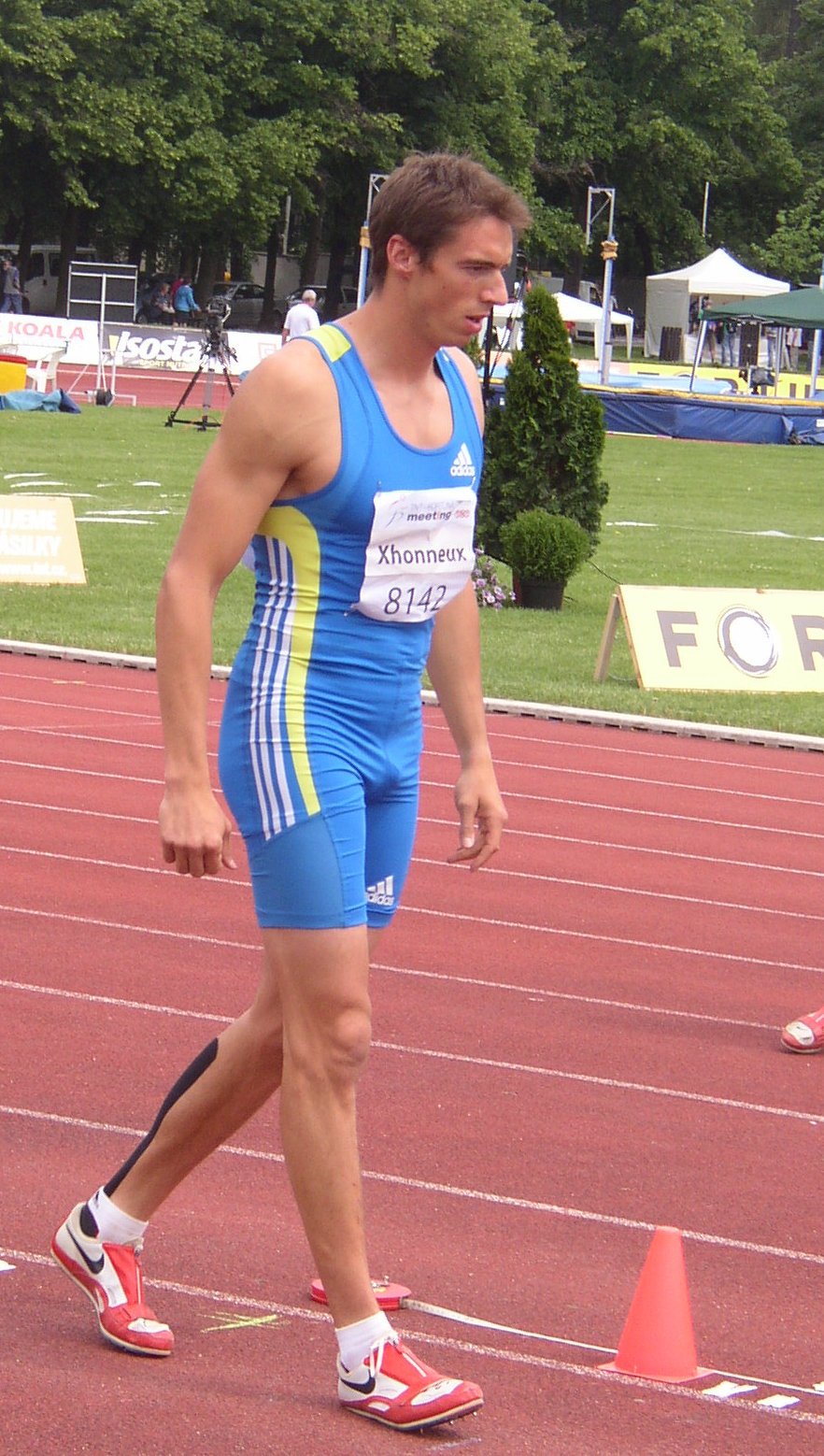
Frédéric Xhonneux at the 2010 TNT - Fortuna Meeting in Kladno

Frédéric Xhonneux (born 11 May 1983 in Brussels) is a Belgian track and field athlete who competes in the decathlon. He is a former Belgian record holder in the event with a score of 8142 points, achieved in May 2008 in Desenzano del Garda at the Multistars meeting.

== Achievements ==
Year	Competition	Venue	Position	Event	Notes
Representing Belgium
2005	European U23 Championships	Erfurt, Germany	4th	Decathlon	7745 pts
2005	World Championships	Helsinki, Finland	14th	Decathlon	7616 pts
2005	Jeux de la Francophonie	Niamey, Niger	6th	Decathlon	7008 pts
2007	European Indoor Championships	Birmingham, United Kingdom	9th	Heptathlon	5720 pts
2008	Olympic Games	Beijing, China	–	Decathlon	DNF
2013	Jeux de la Francophonie	Nice, France	5th	Decathlon	7289 pts
