= Frank Müller =

German decathlete (born 1968)

Personal information
- Born: 18 June 1968 (age 58) Norden, Lower Saxony, West Germany

Sport
- Sport: Decathlon

Frank Müller (born 18 June 1968) is a retired male decathlete from Germany. He twice competed at the Summer Olympics for his native country (1992 and 1996). Müller set his personal best (8.256 points) in the men's decathlon on 22 July 2000 in Salzgitter.

== Achievements ==
Year	Competition	Venue	Position	Event	Notes
Representing Germany
1990	Hypo-Meeting	Götzis, Austria	7th	Decathlon	
1990	European Championships	Split, FR Yugoslavia	10th	Decathlon	
1992	Hypo-Meeting	Götzis, Austria	4th	Decathlon	
1992	Olympic Games	Barcelona, Spain	13th	Decathlon	
1994	Hypo-Meeting	Götzis, Austria	10th	Decathlon	
1995	Hypo-Meeting	Götzis, Austria	14th	Decathlon	
1996	Hypo-Meeting	Götzis, Austria	7th	Decathlon	
1996	Olympic Games	Atlanta, United States	14th	Decathlon	
