= Katsuhiko Matsuda =

Japanese decathlete (born 1965)

Personal information
- Born: May 10, 1965 (age 61)

Sport
- Sport: Decathlon
Medal record
Representing Japan
Asian Championships
Bronze medal – third place	1991 Kuala Lumpur	Decathlon

Katsuhiko Matsuda (Japanese: 松田 克彦; born May 10, 1965) is a retired male decathlete from Japan.

== International competitions ==
Representing Japan
Year	Competition	Venue	Position	Event	Notes
1991	Asian Championships	Kuala Lumpur, Malaysia	3rd	Decathlon	7364
1993	World Championships	Stuttgart, Germany	20th	Decathlon	7140
