= John Crist (decathlete) =

American decathlete

John Harrison Crist (born August 28, 1954) is a retired decathlete from the United States, who finished in sixth place (8130 points) at the 1984 Summer Olympics in Los Angeles, California. He is a three-time national champion (1981, 1982 and 1985) in the men's decathlon.

Crist went to Arlington Schools in Atlanta, Georgia, where he was on a state championship basketball team. He was an All-American for the Alabama Crimson Tide track and field team, finishing 7th in the decathlon at the 1976 NCAA Division I Outdoor Track and Field Championships. He was also a Southeastern Conference champion.

He later became the owner of "Memories" swingdance club in California, which has been open at its location in Whittier, California for over 15 years.
