= Alain Blondel =

French decathlete

Medal record

Men's athletics

Representing France

European Championships
Gold medal – first place	1994 Helsinki	Decathlon

Alain Blondel (born 7 December 1962 in Petit-Quevilly, Seine-Maritime) is a retired French decathlete. During his career he won the European title once.

== Achievements ==
Year	Competition	Venue	Position	Event	Notes
Representing France
1986	European Championships	Stuttgart, West Germany	8th	Decathlon	8185 pts
1987	Hypo-Meeting	Götzis, Austria	3rd	Decathlon	8228 pts
1987	World Championships	Rome, Italy	7th	Decathlon	8178 pts
1988	Olympic Games	Seoul, South Korea	6th	Decathlon	8268 pts
1990	European Championships	Split, Yugoslavia	5th	Decathlon	8216 pts
1991	World Championships	Tokyo, Japan	13th	Decathlon	7848 pts
1992	Olympic Games	Barcelona, Spain	15th	Decathlon	8031 pts
1993	World Championships	Stuttgart, Germany	5th	Decathlon	8444 pts
1994	European Indoor Championships	Paris, France	3rd	Heptathlon	6084 pts
1994	European Championships	Helsinki, Finland	1st	Decathlon	8453 pts
1995	World Championships	Gothenburg, Sweden	—	Decathlon	DNF
