= Dean Barton-Smith =

Australian decathlete

Personal information
- Nationality: Australian
- Born: 1 November 1967 (age 58) Canberra, Australia
- Height: 182 cm (6 ft 0 in)
- Weight: 82 kg (181 lb)

Sport
- Sport: Athletics
- Event: Decathlon

Dean Bryan Barton-Smith, AM (born 1 November 1967) is an Australian former decathlete who competed in the 1992 Summer Olympics.

== Biography ==
Smith finished second behind Eric Hollingsworth in the decathlon event at the British 1991 AAA Championships.

Barton-Smith also won medals at the Deaflympics in 1989, 1993 and 2005. Barton-Smith is most noted for his work and advocacy with the Australian Federation of Disability Organisations, Deaf Sports Australia and the Deaflympics. Smith also holds world record in Decathlon and also represented Australia at the Commonwealth Games in 1990 and 1994.

He is the former CEO of Deaf Children Australia. In 2013, Barton-Smith was appointed a Member of the Order of Australia.
