= Robert de Wit =

Dutch decathlete

Robert ("Rob") Hubert Maria de Wit (born 7 August 1962 in Eindhoven, North Brabant) is a retired decathlete from the Netherlands. He competed in two consecutive Summer Olympics for his native country, starting in 1988 and is still holding the Dutch national record of 8.447 points in the declathon, achieved in 1988.

In 1994 De Wit participated in the 1994 Winter Olympics in Lillehammer, Norway, as a member of the Dutch bobsledding team, finishing in 24th place in the two-mans discipline.

== Achievements ==
Year	Competition	Venue	Position	Notes
Representing Netherlands
1983	World Championships	Helsinki, Finland	12th	Decathlon
1986	Hypo-Meeting	Götzis, Austria	6th	Decathlon
1986	European Championships	Stuttgart, West Germany	9th	Decathlon
1987	World Championships	Rome, Italy	DNF	Decathlon
1988	Olympic Games	Seoul, South Korea	8th	Decathlon
1990	Hypo-Meeting	Götzis, Austria	14th	Decathlon
1992	Hypo-Meeting	Götzis, Austria	6th	Decathlon
1992	Olympic Games	Barcelona, Spain	10th	Decathlon

Awards
Preceded by Han Kulker	Herman van Leeuwen Cup; 1988; 1992	Succeeded by Emiel Mellaard
Preceded by Erik de Bruin	Herman van Leeuwen Cup; 1988; 1992	Succeeded by Bert van Vlaanderen
