= Sten Ekberg =

Swedish athletics competitor

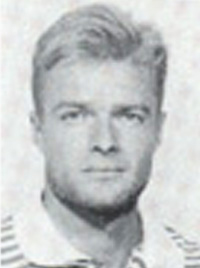
- Sten Ekberg, 1992

Personal information
- Born: Sten Anders Ekberg; December 25, 1964 (age 61) Täby, Stockholm County, Sweden
- Education: Chiropractic; Life University and Southern Methodist University
- Occupation: Chiropractor

Sport
- Country: Sweden
- Sport: Track & Field
- Event: Decathlon
- College team: Southern Methodist University
- Coached by: Kenneth Riggberger

Achievements and titles
- Personal best(s): Decathlon: 8,246 points Heptathlon: 5,802 points: 100-meter dash: 10.99; long jump: 7.31; shot put: 16.15 (indoors); high jump: 2.10; 400-meter run: 48.5; 110-meter hurdles: 14.43; discus throw: 52.16; pole vault: 4.90; javelin throw:63.50; 1,500-meter run: 4:19.96

Sten Anders Ekberg (born 25 December 1964 in Täby, Sweden) is a former decathlon athlete who competed in the 1992 Summer Olympics for Sweden and was a Swedish decathlete National Record holder. Sten Ekberg won the Swedish Championship in both decathlon and heptathlon. Ekberg currently resides in the United States where he works as a chiropractor at his office Wellness For Life in Cumming, Georgia.

== Education ==
Ekberg received a BBA, Magna Cum Laude, from Southern Methodist University Cox School of Business in Dallas, Texas and holds a Doctor of Chiropractic, Magna Cum Laude, from Life University in Marietta, Georgia. He competed in track and field at Southern Methodist where he still holds records.

== Olympics and World Championships ==
- Olympics: Barcelona 9th place, 1992 (8,136 points)
- Swedish National Decathlon Record: 1992 (8,246 points)
- National Championship Decathlon: Sweden 1st place, 1985, 1987, 1990, 1991, 1992
- National Championship Heptathlon: Sweden 1st place, 1989, 1993
- Seven Swedish National Gold Medals
- European Championships: 10th place, 1986
- NCAA Division I: Team Championship 1st place, 1986
- NCAA Division I: Decathlon 2nd place, 1986
- NCAA Division I: Decathlon 3rd place, 1985
- Southern Methodist University Records:
  - 100 Meter 1985
  - 400 Meter 1985
  - 1500 Meter 1985
  - 100 hurdles 1985
  - Shot Put 1985
  - Discus 1985
  - Javelin 1985
  - High Jump 1985
  - Pole Vault 1985 (record still held)
  - Long Jump 1985
  - Decathlon Score 1985 (record still held)

== See also ==
- List of Swedish sportspeople
- List of decathlon national champions (men)
- List of Southern Methodist University people
- List of YouTubers
