= Jürgen Mandl =

Austrian sportsman and politician (born 1965)

Medal record

Bobsleigh

World Championships
Bronze medal – third place	1990 St. Moritz	Four-man

Jürgen Mandl (born August 19, 1965 in Graz) is an Austrian footballer (soccer player), decathlete, and bobsledder who competed from the mid-1970s to the early 1990s.

Mandl started out competing for the Sturm Graz club for six years before switching to decathlon in 1980. He earned his best decathlon score of 7646 in 1986 and was national champion the previous year. A back injury prevented him from competing in the World Championships in Athletics though he did compete at the 1986 European Championships in Athletics in Stuttgart, West Germany in the decathlon, but did not finish. But by then Mandl switched to bobsleigh where he found a degree of success.

Mandl won a bronze medal in the four-man event at the 1990 FIBT World Championships in St. Moritz.

== Decathlon achievements ==
Year	Competition	Venue	Position	Notes
Representing Austria
1984	Hypo-Meeting	Götzis, Austria	11th	Decathlon
