= Vitaliy Kolpakov =

Ukrainian decathlete

Personal information
- Nationality: Ukrainian
- Born: 2 February 1972 (age 54) Luhansk, Soviet Union

Sport
- Sport: Athletics
- Event: Decathlon

Vitaliy Kolpakov (born 2 February 1972) is a Ukrainian athlete. He competed in the men's decathlon at the 1996 Summer Olympics.
