= Gernot Kellermayr =

Austrian decathlete (born 1966)

Personal information
- Born: April 5, 1966 (age 60) Linz, Austria

Sport
- Sport: Decathlon

Gernot Kellermayr (born April 5, 1966) is a retired decathlete from Austria. He competed at the 1992 Summer Olympics.

In 1993 he tested positive for a banned steroid Metandienone, together with his teammates Franz Ratzenberger, Thomas Renner, and Andreas Berger, and was subsequently banned from competition for two years.

== Achievements ==
Year	Competition	Venue	Position	Notes
Representing Austria
1986	Hypo-Meeting	Götzis, Austria	17th	Decathlon
1987	Hypo-Meeting	Götzis, Austria	21st	Decathlon
1988	Hypo-Meeting	Götzis, Austria	20th	Decathlon
1990	Hypo-Meeting	Götzis, Austria	12th	Decathlon
1992	Olympic Games	Barcelona, Spain	11th	Decathlon
1992	Hypo-Meeting	Götzis, Austria	8th	Decathlon
1993	Hypo-Meeting	Götzis, Austria	4th	Decathlon
