= Beat Gähwiler (decathlete) =

Swiss decathlete

Beat Gähwiler (born January 26, 1965) is a retired decathlete from Switzerland, who finished in twelfth place (8114 points) at the 1988 Summer Olympics in Seoul. He also competed at the 1992 Summer Olympics in Barcelona, ending up in 21st place. He is a five-time national champion in the men's decathlon.
