= Patrick Vetterli =

Swiss decathlete

Personal information
- Nationality: Swiss
- Born: 6 October 1961 (age 63)

Sport
- Sport: Athletics
- Event: Decathlon

Patrick Vetterli (born 6 October 1961) is a Swiss athlete. He competed in the men's decathlon at the 1984 Summer Olympics.
