= William Motti =

French athlete

William Motti (born 25 July 1964 in Bondy) is a retired French decathlete.

His personal best of 8327 points was achieved at the Europa Cup in Arles (FR) in 1987.

== Achievements ==
Year	Tournament	Venue	Result	Event
1981	European Junior Championships	Utrecht, Netherlands	2nd	High jump
1984	Olympic Games	Los Angeles, United States	5th	Decathlon
1987	World Championships	Rome, Italy	10th	Decathlon
1992	Olympic Games	Barcelona, Spain	7th	Decathlon
1993	World Indoor Championships	Toronto, Canada	6th	Heptathlon
