= Lars Warming =

Danish decathlete

Personal information
- Nationality: Danish
- Born: 21 June 1963 (age 61); Holme, Aarhus, Denmark

Sport
- Sport: Athletics
- Event: Decathlon

Lars Warming (born 21 June 1963) is a Danish athlete. He competed in the men's decathlon at the 1988 Summer Olympics. His best result in Decathlon is 7994 points which is also current Danish national record.
