= Uwe Freimuth =

East German athletics competitor

Uwe Freimuth (German pronunciation: [ˈuːvə ˈfʁaɪ̯ˌmuːt]; born 10 September 1961 in Rathenow, Bezirk Potsdam) is a retired decathlete from East Germany, who finished in eighteenth place with 7860 points at the 1988 Summer Olympics in Seoul, South Korea.

== Biography ==
He is ranked tenth in the all-time points score ranking for the decathlon. His personal best is 8,792 Points (1984). He scored over 8000 points in 24 competitions.

A former record holder for East Germany, he is a four-time national champion (1984, 1985, 1986, and 1988) in the men's decathlon. He represented the sports club ASK Vorwärts Potsdam. After he retired from competition he started his profession as a club coach in Potsdam. From 1995 until 1998 he was in charge as a National Coach for Decathlon and High Jump in Malaysia. In 1998 he became a union coach in Bavaria and in 2000 he moved as a lecturer to the Institute of Sports at the University of Würzburg, Germany. He became a sports scientist for sports theory and analysis. In 2002 he completed his dissertation. In September 2007 Freimuth returned to Malaysia to head the Department for Development at the Institute of Sports (ISN) in Kuala Lumpur. From October 2009 until October 2011, Freimuth represented the German Olympic Sports Confederation in Hanoi, Vietnam. He was in charge as Technical Director for the Vietnam Athletics Federation. Since September 2013, Freimuth has been Professor of Sport & Event Management at the Business and Information Technology School at Berlin, Hamburg and Iserlohn.

He is the twin brother of high jumper Jörg Freimuth, who won the bronze medal at the 1980 Summer Olympics in Moscow. He is also the father of fellow decathlete Rico Freimuth.
