= Siegfried Wentz =

German decathlete (born 1960)

Personal information
- Born: 7 March 1960 (age 66) Röthenbach bei St. Wolfgang
Medal record
Men's athletics
Representing West Germany
Olympic Games
Bronze medal – third place	1984 Los Angeles	Decathlon
World Championships
Silver medal – second place	1987 Rome	Decathlon
Bronze medal – third place	1983 Helsinki	Decathlon
European Championships
Bronze medal – third place	1986 Stuttgart	Decathlon
Universiade
Gold medal – first place	1987 Zagreb	Decathlon

Siegfried "Siggi" Wentz (German pronunciation: [ˈzɪɡi vɛnt͡s]; born 7 March 1960) is a German former track and field athlete who competed in the decathlon. He is the 1984 Olympic bronze medallist, and a two-time World Championship medallist.

== Career ==
Wentz was born in Rothenbach. In the 1980s and until 1990 he represented West Germany and belonged to the world elite in the decathlon. His most notable result was winning the bronze medal at the 1984 Summer Olympics in Los Angeles, California. At that event he scored 8412 points, his results for each of the events were 10.99s - 7.11m - 15.87m - 2.09m - 47.78s - 14.35s - 46.60m - 4.50m - 67.68m - 4:33.96 min.

His personal best result of 8762 points in Filderstadt-Bernhausen on 5 June 1983, placed him third on the world all-time list at that time behind Jürgen Hingsen and Daley Thompson, and still ranks him 14th on the all-time list (as of 2018). It ranks him third among German decathletes, only behind Hingsen and Uwe Freimuth.

After his career in sports, Wentz became a doctor, eventually rising to chief doctor at the Schlüsselbad clinic in Bad Peterstal (Black Forest).

== International competitions ==
Year	Competition	Venue	Position	Notes
1982	European Championships	Athens, Greece	20th	7284 pts
1983	World Championships	Helsinki, Finland	3rd	8478 pts
1984	Olympic Games	Los Angeles, United States	3rd	8412 pts
1986	European Championships	Stuttgart, Germany	3rd	8676 pts
1987	Universiade	Zagreb, Yugoslavia	1st	8348 pts
1987	World Championship	Rome. Italy	2nd	8461 pts
1990	European Championships	Split, Yugoslavia	12th	7810 pts

Wentz represented USC Mainz sports club. During his active sport career he was 1.93 meters tall and weighed 93 kilograms.

== Publications ==
- Altmaier, Doris; Wentz, Siegfried: Ernährung mit Spaß - Bewegung mit Maß (Nutrition with Fun - Movement with Measure), 2004, Fitness Advisor

== See also ==
- Men's heptathlon world record progression

Records
Preceded by (Soviet Union) Aleksandr Nevskiy	Men's heptathlon world record holder 20 February 1982 – 12 February 1989	Succeeded by (France) Christian Plaziat
