= Hypo-Meeting =

Annual athletics event in Götzis, Austria

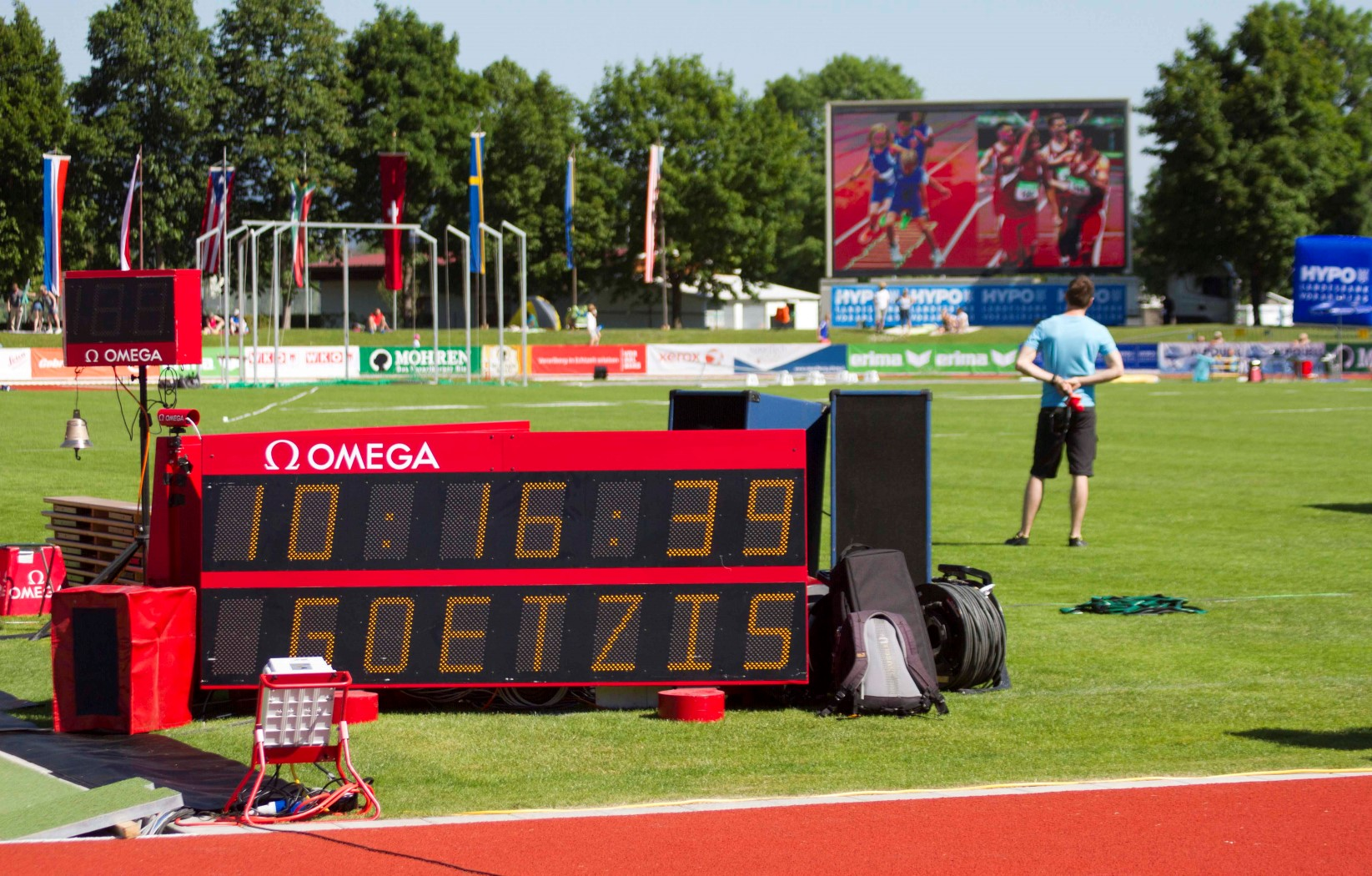
- The Hypo-Meeting in Götzis
- Date: last weekend of May
- Location: Götzis, Austria
- Event type: Combined events
- Established: 1975
- Website: meeting-goetzis.at
- 2026 Hypo-Meeting

The Hypo-Meeting is an annual athletics competition that takes place in the Mösle stadium in Götzis in Vorarlberg (Austria) held in the spring (late May, early June). In its history, a total of three world records have been set: 1980 and 1982 by Daley Thompson (8648 and 8730 points), and 2001 by Roman Šebrle (9026 points).

Organised by the International Association of Athletics Federations (IAAF), it is one of the athletics meetings that make up the IAAF Combined Events Challenge. Male and female athletes compete in the decathlon or heptathlon, respectively, and points scored at the Hypo-Meeting count towards a yearly total for the parent competition.

== History ==
In 1972, the Montfort community for athletics (Leichtathletikgemeinschaft Montfort) was founded in Götzis, Vorarlberg. A year later, the community offered to hold the Austrian Multi-Discipline Championship which they ultimately did in 1975, superseding the traditional multi-discipline event in Schielleiten.

The meeting has been sponsored by the Hypo Vorarlberg Bank AG for over 40 years, hence its name.

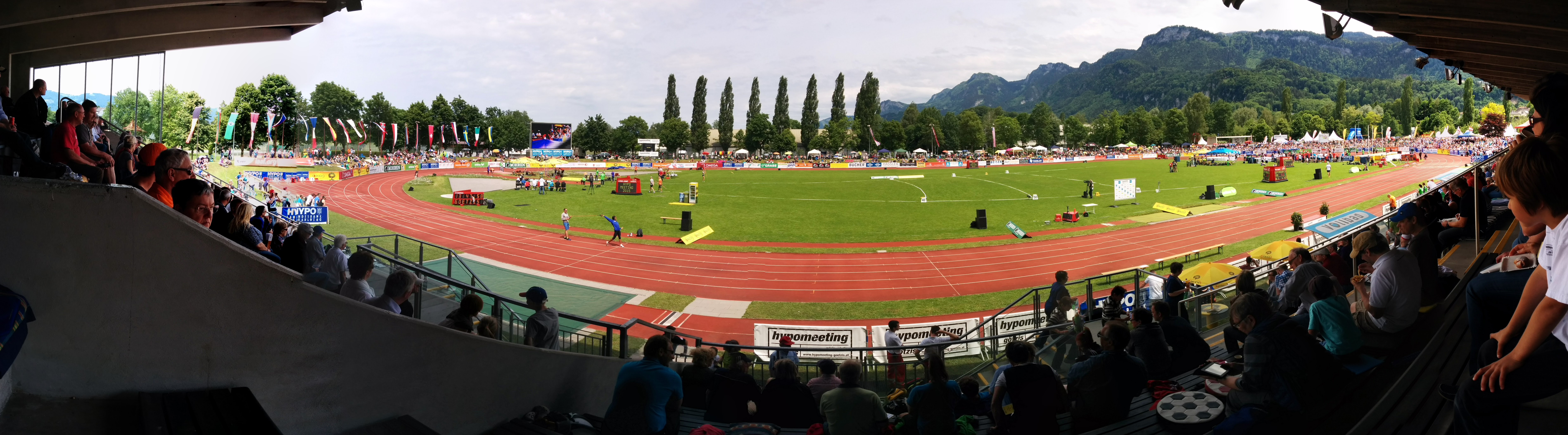
2015 Hypo-Meeting

== Competition format ==
Following the setup of virtually all major combined events competitions, the events programme is split over two days.

Decathlon		Heptathlon	
Day one	Day two	Day one	Day two
100 metres	110 metres hurdles	100 metres hurdles	Long jump
Long jump	Discus throw	High jump	Javelin throw
Shot put	Pole vault	Shot put	800 metres
High jump	Javelin throw	200 metres	—
400 metres	1500 metres	—	—

== Records ==
Event	Athlete	Record	Date	Ref.
Men's decathlon	Roman Šebrle (CZE)	9026 points	27 May 2001	
100 m	Damian Warner (CAN)	10.12 (+0.9 m/s)	25 May 2019	
Long jump	Simon Ehammer (SUI)	8.51 m (+1.0 m/s)	30 May 2026	
Shot put	Michael Smith (CAN)	17.45 m	31 May 1997	
High jump	Christian Schenk (GDR)	2.23 m	16 June 1990	
400 m	Ayden Owens-Delerme (PUR)	46.40	31 May 2025	
110 m hurdles	Damian Warner (CAN)	13.36 (+0.9 m/s)	30 May 2021	
Discus throw	Norbert Demel (GER)	55.14 m	28 May 1995	
Pole vault	Erki Nool (EST)	5.55 m	4 June 2000	
Javelin throw	Niklas Kaul (GER)	79.21 m	31 May 2026	
1500 m	Jeff Tesselaar (NED)	4:08.31	1 June 2025	
Women's heptathlon	Anna Hall (USA)	7032 points	1 June 2025	
100 m hurdles	Michelle Atherley (USA)	12.71 (+1.3 m/s)	18 May 2024	
High jump	Nafissatou Thiam (BEL)	2.01 m	26 May 2018	
Shot put	Austra Skujytė (LTU)	16.92 m	28 May 2005	
200 m	Dafne Schippers (NED)	22.35 (+1.5 m/s)	31 May 2014	
Long jump	Svetlana Moskalets (RUS)	6.93 m	28 May 1995	
Javelin throw	Anouk Vetter (NED)	59.81 m	29 May 2022	
800 m	Anna Hall (USA)	2:01.23	1 June 2025	

== Winners ==
Edition	Men's Decathlon		Women's Heptathlon (*Pentathlon)	
Edition	Winner	Points	Winner	Points
1975	Peter Kratky (TCH)	7591	Burglinde Pollak (GDR)	4542*
1976	Guido Kratschmer (FRG)	8309	Diane Jones (CAN)	4641*
1977	Sepp Zeilbauer (AUT)	8039	Diane Konihowski (CAN)	4639*
1978	Guido Kratschmer (FRG)	8411	Jane Frederick (USA)	4651*
1979	Thierry Dubois (FRA)	8139	Jane Frederick (USA)	4708*
1980	Daley Thompson (GBR)	8648	Yekaterina Smirnova (URS)	4677*
1981	Sepp Zeilbauer (AUT)	8182	Jane Frederick (USA)	6291
1982	Daley Thompson (GBR)	8730	Jane Frederick (USA)	6438
1983	Grigoriy Degtyaryev (URS)	8480	Natalya Shubenkova (URS)	6517
1984	Grigoriy Degtyaryev (URS)	8617	Nadezhda Vinogradova (URS)	6289
1985	Uwe Freimuth (GDR)	8473	Jane Frederick (USA)	6666
1986	Guido Kratschmer (FRG)	8519	Jackie Joyner-Kersee (USA)	6841
1987	Siegfried Wentz (FRG)	8645	Anke Behmer (GDR)	6692
1988	Uwe Freimuth (GDR)	8381	Anke Behmer (GDR)	6805
1989	Christian Plaziat (FRA)	8485	Anke Behmer (GDR)	6686
1990	Christian Schenk (GDR)	8481	Sabine Braun (FRG)	6604
1991	Michael Smith (CAN)	8427	Sabine Braun (GER)	6584
1992	Robert Změlík (TCH)	8627	Sabine Braun (GER)	6985
1993	Eduard Hämäläinen (BLR)	8604	Svetla Dimitrova (BUL)	6594
1994	Eduard Hämäläinen (BLR)	8735	Sabine Braun (GER)	6665
1995	Erki Nool (EST)	8575	Ghada Shouaa (SYR)	6715
1996	Michael Smith (CAN)	8626	Ghada Shouaa (SYR)	6942
1997	Eduard Hämäläinen (FIN)	8617	Denise Lewis (GBR)	6736
1998	Erki Nool (EST)	8672	Irina Belova (RUS)	6466
1999	Tomáš Dvořák (CZE)	8738	DeDee Nathan (USA)	6577
2000	Tomáš Dvořák (CZE)	8900	Eunice Barber (FRA)	6842
2001	Roman Šebrle (CZE)	9026	Eunice Barber (FRA)	6736
2002	Roman Šebrle (CZE)	8800	Shelia Burrell (USA)	6363
2003	Roman Šebrle (CZE)	8807	Carolina Klüft (SWE)	6602
2004	Roman Šebrle (CZE)	8842	Carolina Klüft (SWE)	6820
2005	Roman Šebrle (CZE)	8534	Carolina Klüft (SWE)	6824
2006	Bryan Clay (USA)	8677	Carolina Klüft (SWE)	6719
2007	Andrei Krauchanka (BLR)	8617	Carolina Klüft (SWE)	6681
2008	Dmitriy Karpov (KAZ)	8504	Tatyana Chernova (RUS)	6618
2009	Michael Schrader (GER)	8522	Nataliya Dobrynska (UKR)	6558
2010	Bryan Clay (USA)	8483	Jessica Ennis (GBR)	6689
2011	Trey Hardee (USA)	8689	Jessica Ennis (GBR)	6790
2012	Hans van Alphen (BEL)	8519	Jessica Ennis (GBR)	6906
2013	Damian Warner (CAN)	8307	Brianne Theisen (CAN)	6376
2014	Trey Hardee (USA)	8518	Katarina Johnson-Thompson (GBR)	6682
2015	Kai Kazmirek (GER)	8462	Brianne Theisen-Eaton (CAN)	6808
2016	Damian Warner (CAN)	8523	Brianne Theisen-Eaton (CAN)	6765
2017	Damian Warner (CAN)	8591	Nafissatou Thiam (BEL)	7013
2018	Damian Warner (CAN)	8795	Nafissatou Thiam (BEL)	6806
2019	Damian Warner (CAN)	8711	Katarina Johnson-Thompson (GBR)	6813
2021	Damian Warner (CAN)	8995	Xenia Krizsan (HUN)	6651
2022	Damian Warner (CAN)	8797	Anouk Vetter (NED)	6693
2023	Pierce LePage (CAN)	8700	Anna Hall (USA)	6988
2024	Damian Warner (CAN)	8678	Anouk Vetter (NED)	6642
2025	Sander Skotheim (NOR)	8909	Anna Hall (USA)	7032
2026	Simon Ehammer (SUI)	8778	Annik Kälin (SUI)	6726
