= 1990 in the decathlon =

This page lists the World Best Year Performance in the year 1990 in the men's decathlon. One of the main events during this season were the 1990 European Championships in Split, Yugoslavia, where the competition started on August 28, 1990, and ended on August 29, 1990.

== Records ==
Standing records prior to the 1990 season in track and field
| World Record | Daley Thompson (GBR) | 8847 | August 9, 1984 | Los Angeles, United States |

== 1990 World Year Ranking ==
| Rank | Points | Athlete | Venue | Date | Note |
|---|---|---|---|---|---|
| 1 | 8574 | Christian Plaziat (FRA) | Split, Yugoslavia | 1990-08-29 | NR |
| 2 | 8525 | Michael Smith (CAN) | Auckland, New Zealand | 1990-01-29 | |
| 3 | 8481 | Christian Schenk (GDR) | Götzis, Austria | 1990-06-17 | |
| 4 | 8436 | Dezső Szabó (HUN) | Split, Yugoslavia | 1990-08-29 | PB |
| 5 | 8403 | Dave Johnson (USA) | Seattle, United States | 1990-07-25 | |
| 6 | 8358 | Dan O'Brien (USA) | Seattle, United States | 1990-07-25 | |
| 7 | 8330 | Mikhail Medved (URS) | Seattle, United States | 1990-07-25 | |
| 8 | 8289 | Michael Kohnle (FRG) | Salzgitter, West Germany | 1990-07-22 | |
| 9 | 8275 | Torsten Voss (GDR) | Neubrandenburg, East Germany | 1990-05-27 | |
| 10 | 8256 | Frank Müller (GDR) | Salzgitter, West Germany | 1990-07-22 | PB |
| 11 | 8249 | Robert Změlík (CZE) | Split, Yugoslavia | 1990-08-29 | |
| 12 | 8216 | Alain Blondel (FRA) | Split, Yugoslavia | 1990-08-29 | |
| 13 | 8214 | Antonio Peñalver (ESP) | Split, Yugoslavia | 1990-08-29 | |
| 14 | 8169 | Andrei Nazarov (EST) | Sochi, Soviet Union | 1990-05-20 | |
| 15 | 8146 | Beat Gähwiler (SUI) | Split, Yugoslavia | 1990-08-29 | |
| 16 | 8138 | Siegfried Wentz (FRG) | Götzis, Austria | 1990-06-17 | |
| 17 | 8121 | Rišardas Malachovskis (URS) | Sochi, Soviet Union | 1990-05-20 | |
| 18 | 8098 | Rob Muzzio (USA) | Emmitsburg, United States | 1990-09-09 | |
| 19 | 8088 | Roman Terekhov (URS) | Sochi, Soviet Union | 1990-05-20 | |
| 20 | 8057 | Saša Karan (YUG) | Ljubljana, Yugoslavia | 1990-07-01 | NR |
| 21 | 8054 | Aleksey Lyakh (URS) | Spokane, United States | 1990-07-22 | |
| 22 | 8052 | Henrik Dagård (SWE) | Split, Yugoslavia | 1990-08-29 | |
| 23 | 8040 | Thorsten Dauth (FRG) | Salzgitter, West Germany | 1990-07-22 | |
| 24 | 8033 | Gary Kinder (USA) | Emmitsburg, United States | 1990-09-09 | |
| 25 | 8015 | Sten Ekberg (SWE) | Värnamo, Sweden | 1990-07-29 | |

== See also ==
- 1990 Hypo-Meeting
- 1990 Décastar
