= 1993 in the decathlon =

This page lists the World Best Year Performance in the year 1993 in the men's decathlon. One of the main events during this season were the 1993 World Championships in Stuttgart, Germany, where the competition started on Thursday August 19, 1993, and ended on Friday August 20, 1993.

== Records ==
Standing records prior to the 1993 season in track and field
World record	Dan O'Brien (USA)	8891	September 5, 1992	Talence, France

== 1993 World Year Ranking ==
Rank	Points	Athlete	Venue	Date	Note
1	8817	Dan O'Brien (USA)	Stuttgart, Germany	August 20	
2	8724	Eduard Hämäläinen (BLR)	Stuttgart, Germany	August 20	
3	8548	Paul Meier (GER)	Stuttgart, Germany	August 20	PB
4	8500	Christian Schenk (GER)	Stuttgart, Germany	August 20	PB
5	8444	Alain Blondel (FRA)	Stuttgart, Germany	August 20	
6	8398	Christian Plaziat (FRA)	Stuttgart, Germany	August 20	
7	8362	Michael Smith (CAN)	Götzis, Austria	May 30	
8	8324	Steve Fritz (USA)	Stuttgart, Germany	August 20	
9	8297	Vitaliy Kolpakov (UKR)	Kyiv, Ukraine	June 6	PB
10	8296	Sheldon Blockburger (USA)	Brescia, Italy	May 16	
11	8237	Rob Muzzio (USA)	Stuttgart, Germany	August 20	PB
12	8188	Robert Změlík (CZE)	Götzis, Austria	May 30	
13	8156	Lev Lobodin (RUS)	Götzis, Austria	May 30	
14	8146	Mikhail Medved (UKR)	Götzis, Austria	May 30	
15	8101	Dezső Szabó (HUN)	Brescia, Italy	May 16	
16	8076	Petri Keskitalo (FIN)	Oulu, Finland	July 11	
17	8075	Michael Kohnle (GER)	Stuttgart, Germany	August 20	
18	8074	Torsten Voss (GER)	Vaterstetten, Germany	June 20	
19	8061	Stefan Schmid (GER)	Aachen, Germany	August 8	
20	8054	Tomáš Dvořák (CZE)	Tours, France	August 30	
21	8052	Kip Janvrin (USA)	Aachen, Germany	August 8	
22	8013	Aric Long (USA)	Eugene, United States	June 16	
23	8007	Chris Huffins (USA)	New Orleans, United States	June 5	
24	7995	Munehiro Kaneko (JPN)	Shanghai, China	May 14	NR
25	7986	Alex Kruger (GBR)	Alhama de Murcia, Spain	May 2	

== See also ==
- 1993 Hypo-Meeting
- 1993 Décastar
