= 1991 in the decathlon =

This page lists the World Best Year Performance in the year 1991 in the men's decathlon. One of the main events during this season were the 1991 IAAF World Championships in Tokyo, Japan, where the competition started on Thursday August 29, 1991, and ended on Friday August 30, 1991.

== Records ==
Standing records prior to the 1991 season in track and field
World Record	Daley Thompson (GBR)	8847	August 9, 1984	Los Angeles, United States

== 1991 World Year Ranking ==
Rank	Points	Athlete	Venue	Date	Note
1	8812	Dan O'Brien (USA)	Tokyo, Japan	1991-08-30	
2	8549	Michael Smith (CAN)	Tokyo, Japan	1991-08-30	
3	8518	Christian Plaziat (FRA)	Helmond, Netherlands	1991-07-07	
4	8467	Dave Johnson (USA)	New York City, United States	1991-06-13	
5	8402	Christian Schenk (GER)	Helmond, Netherlands	1991-07-07	
6	8379	Robert Změlík (CZE)	Tokyo, Japan	1991-08-30	
7	8318	Petri Keskitalo (FIN)	Tokyo, Japan	1991-08-30	PB
8	8306	Antonio Peñalver (ESP)	Alhama de Murcia, Spain	1991-06-02	
9	8278	Mikhail Medved (URS)	Götzis, Austria	1991-06-16	
10	8267	Simon Poelman (NZL)	Tokyo, Japan	1991-08-30	
11	8233	Eduard Hämäläinen (URS)	Tokyo, Japan	1991-08-30	
12	8224	William Motti (FRA)	Emmitsburg, United States	1991-09-29	
13	8211	Alain Blondel (FRA)	Helmond, Netherlands	1991-07-07	
14	8166	Sheldon Blockburger (USA)	Baton Rouge, United States	1991-03-30	
15	8156	Thorsten Dauth (GER)	Götzis, Austria	1991-06-16	
16	8141	Dezső Szabó (HUN)	Budapest, Hungary	1991-09-15	
17	8119	Rob Muzzio (USA)	New York City, United States	1991-06-13	
18	8093	Rišardas Malachovskis (LTU)	Kielce, Poland	1991-06-16	
19	8079	Andrew Fucci (USA)	New York City, United States	1991-06-13	
19	8079	Steve Fritz (USA)	Sheffield, United Kingdom	1991-07-24	
21	8076	Beat Gähwiler (SUI)	Helmond, Netherlands	1991-07-07	
22	8062	Michael Kohnle (GER)	Götzis, Austria	1991-06-16	
23	8030	Brian Brophy (USA)	Baton Rouge, United States	1991-03-30	
24	8018	Lev Lobodin (URS)	Kyiv, Soviet Union	1991-06-20	
25	8017	Frank Müller (GER)	Talence, France	1991-09-22	

== See also ==
- 1991 Hypo-Meeting
- 1991 Décastar
