= 1993 World Championships in Athletics – Men's decathlon =

These are the official results of the Men's Decathlon competition at the 1993 World Championships in Stuttgart, Germany. There were a total number of 25 participating athletes, including three non-finishers. The competition started on Thursday August 19, 1993, and ended on Friday August 20, 1993. The gold medal was won by Dan O'Brien of the United States with a score of 8817 points.

== Medalists ==
Gold	Dan O'Brien; United States (USA)
Silver	Eduard Hämäläinen; Belarus (BLR)
Bronze	Paul Meier; Germany (GER)

== Schedule ==
August 19
1. 100 m
2. Long Jump
3. Shot Put
4. High Jump
5. 400 m

August 20
6. 110 m hurdles
7. Discus Throw
8. Pole Vault
9. Javelin Throw
10. 1,500 m

== Records ==
Standing records prior to the 1993 World Athletics Championships
World Record	Dan O'Brien (USA)	8891	September 5, 1992	Talence, France
Event Record	Dan O'Brien (USA)	8812	August 30, 1991	Tokyo, Japan
Season Best	Michael Smith (CAN)	8262	May 30, 1993	Götzis, Austria

== Final standings ==
The highest mark recorded in each event is highlighted in yellow. These marks were split between eight competitors with the gold medallist claiming three of them. Three men tied for the high jump clearing 2.15 metres.

Rank	Athlete	Nationality	100m	LJ	SP	HJ	400m	110m H	DT	PV	JT	1500m	Points	Notes
1st place, gold medalist(s)	Dan O'Brien	United States	10.57	7.99	15.41	2.03	47.46	14.08	47.92	5.20	62.56	4:40.08	8817	CR
2nd place, silver medalist(s)	Eduard Hämäläinen	Belarus	10.72	7.05	15.49	2.09	47.64	13.57	49.26	5.30	61.88	4:39.34	8724	
3rd place, bronze medalist(s)	Paul Meier	Germany	10.57	7.57	15.45	2.15	47.73	14.63	45.72	4.60	61.22	4:32.05	8548	
4	Christian Schenk	Germany	11.22	7.63	15.72	2.15	48.78	15.29	46.94	4.80	65.32	4:24.44	8500	
5	Alain Blondel	France	10.94	7.20	14.06	1.94	48.12	14.40	45.74	5.40	62.22	4:19.89	8444	
6	Christian Plaziat	France	10.80	7.50	14.47	2.09	47.91	14.36	41.74	5.00	56.96	4:26.31	8398	
7	Steve Fritz	United States	10.83	7.52	13.87	2.03	48.40	13.99	41.62	4.90	57.68	4:23.56	8324	
8	Rob Muzzio	United States	11.11	6.72	16.99	1.94	49.82	14.51	47.90	5.00	64.50	4:34.43	8237	
9	Michael Kohnle	Germany	11.16	7.40	14.34	2.00	50.17	14.51	44.70	5.00	62.10	4:47.95	8075	
10	Tomáš Dvořák	Czech Republic	10.93	7.20	14.69	2.00	49.40	14.21	42.66	4.50	61.30	4:37.79	8032	
11	Petri Keskitalo	Finland	11.03	7.30	14.85	1.94	50.76	14.66	43.26	5.00	63.92	4:49.48	8032	
12	Indrek Kaseorg	Estonia	11.41	7.31	11.97	2.12	48.99	14.97	40.40	4.60	57.46	4:19.20	7911	
13	Henrik Dagård	Sweden	10.95	7.05	14.44	1.76	48.36	14.62	42.72	4.70	64.78	4:44.09	7838	
14	Sébastien Levicq	France	11.36	7.15	13.48	1.97	51.75	15.10	41.48	5.10	64.00	4:41.43	7783	
15	Ramil Ganiyev	Uzbekistan	11.09	7.26	14.07	2.03	49.80	14.64	39.78	5.10	43.00	4:45.26	7734	
16	Ronalds Blums	Latvia	11.32	7.15	12.96	1.97	50.55	14.67	39.12	5.00	57.16	4:33.59	7734	
17	Sándor Munkácsi	Hungary	11.12	7.08	13.36	1.94	48.71	14.60	41.02	4.50	51.04	4:21.97	7726	
18	Xavier Brunet	Spain	11.16	6.88	12.13	2.15	49.09	14.62	37.86	4.60	49.14	4:46.72	7547	
19	Alex Kruger	Great Britain	11.34	7.07	13.90	2.06	50.33	15.10	40.00	4.40	54.04	4:52.53	7481	
20	Katsuhiko Matsuda	Japan	11.30	7.03	12.39	1.97	49.68	14.61	38.32	4.40	43.40	5:03.56	7140	
21	Munehiro Kaneko	Japan	11.24	NM	13.25	2.00	49.60	14.52	45.08	4.70	57.78	4:55.28	6912	
22	Barry Walsh	Ireland	11.66	6.73	14.21	1.94	51.29	15.36	45.38	NM	55.52	4:42.59	6632	
	Robert Změlík	Czechoslovakia	10.78	7.41	13.21	1.97	DNS	–	–	–	–	–	DNF	
	Dezső Szabó	Hungary	11.02	7.01	13.16	1.94	DNS	–	–	–	–	–	DNF	
	Mike Smith	Canada	10.99	NM	DNS	–	–	–	–	–	–	–	DNF	

== See also ==
- 1992 Men's Olympic Decathlon
- 1993 Hypo-Meeting
- 1993 Decathlon Year Ranking
- 1994 Men's European Championships Decathlon
