= 1991 World Championships in Athletics – Men's decathlon =

These are the official results of the Men's Decathlon competition at the 1991 World Championships in Tokyo, Japan. There were a total number of 27 participating athletes, excluding three non-starters, and the competition starting on Thursday August 29, 1991, and ending on Friday August 30, 1991.

== Medalists ==
Gold	Dan O'Brien; United States (USA)
Silver	Mike Smith; Canada (CAN)
Bronze	Christian Schenk; Germany (GER)

== Schedule ==
Thursday, August 29
1. 100 m
2. Long Jump
3. Shot Put
4. High Jump
5. 400 m

Friday, August 30
6. 110 m hurdles
7. Discus Throw
8. Pole Vault
9. Javelin Throw
10. 1,500 m

== Records ==
Standing records prior to the 1991 World Athletics Championships
World Record	Daley Thompson (GBR)	8847	August 9, 1984	Los Angeles, United States
Event Record	Daley Thompson (GBR)	8714	August 13, 1983	Helsinki, Finland
Season Best	Christian Plaziat (FRA)	8518	July 7, 1991	Helmond, Netherlands
Broken records during the 1991 World Athletics Championships
Event Record	Dan O'Brien (USA)	8812	August 30, 1991	Tokyo, Japan
Season Best	Dan O'Brien (USA)	8812	August 30, 1991	Tokyo, Japan

== Final standings ==
The highest mark recorded in each event is highlighted in yellow. These marks were split between six competitors with the gold medallist claiming five of them. As of 2024, this is the only time a decathlete has claimed the best score for more than four events at these championships.

Rank	Athlete	Nationality	100m	LJ	SP	HJ	400m	110m H	DT	PV	JT	1500m	Points	Notes
1st place, gold medalist(s)	Dan O'Brien	United States	10.41	7.90	16.24	1.91	46.53	13.94	47.20	5.20	60.66	4:37.50	8812	CR
2nd place, silver medalist(s)	Mike Smith	Canada	10.81	7.67	15.69	2.09	47.53	14.78	48.42	4.40	65.46	4:29.14	8549	
3rd place, bronze medalist(s)	Christian Schenk	Germany	11.37	7.55	15.77	2.18	50.10	15.26	45.98	4.90	61.98	4:22.58	8394	
4	Robert Změlík	Czechoslovakia	10.85	7.84	13.42	2.00	49.48	14.07	44.04	5.00	57.80	4:21.24	8379	
5	Petri Keskitalo	Finland	10.93	7.58	15.06	2.03	50.26	14.27	44.22	4.80	69.22	4:46.03	8318	
6	Simon Poelman	New Zealand	10.82	7.32	15.88	2.06	50.10	14.63	45.06	5.00	56.56	4:36.36	8267	
7	Eduard Hämäläinen	Soviet Union	10.99	7.34	15.16	2.09	49.28	14.51	45.48	4.90	55.64	4:36.85	8233	
8	Antonio Peñalver	Spain	11.17	7.32	16.52	2.03	50.00	15.38	50.66	4.50	63.08	4:32.95	8200	
9	Christian Plaziat	France	10.88	7.28	13.87	2.09	48.72	14.38	44.30	4.90	48.62	4:29.98	8122	
10	Thorsten Dauth	Germany	10.74	6.99	15.36	2.03	48.13	14.88	42.96	4.30	60.46	4:28.09	8069	
11	Beat Gähwiler	Switzerland	11.27	7.13	13.86	1.88	49.18	14.73	44.36	4.80	60.36	4:11.82	8011	
12	Michael Kohnle	Germany	10.90	7.52	14.47	2.03	49.63	14.57	42.28	4.70	58.68	4:51.98	8000	
13	Alain Blondel	France	11.03	7.20	13.15	1.94	48.43	14.49	39.16	4.80	55.40	4:30.56	7848	
14	Munehiro Kaneko	Japan	11.33	7.18	13.49	1.94	50.19	15.17	43.76	4.50	60.84	4:37.86	7672	
15	Paul Scott	Australia	11.01	6.82	12.31	1.97	48.15	15.46	39.14	4.50	61.78	4:27.13	7663	
16	Jan Trefny	Switzerland	11.41	6.59	13.93	1.91	49.31	15.00	41.36	4.30	60.84	4:16.95	7610	
17	Lars Warming	Denmark	11.28	6.90	13.28	1.85	48.84	15.02	42.06	4.40	53.02	4:21.79	7529	
18	Saša Karan	Yugoslavia	11.32	6.79	13.06	1.94	49.53	15.37	47.16	4.20	52.38	4:30.03	7468	
19	Alper Kasapoğlu	Turkey	11.14	6.85	12.62	1.94	50.90	15.50	40.90	4.40	48.22	4:41.62	7211	
20	Rob Muzzio	United States	11.41	6.80	16.62	1.97	51.42	15.33	50.06	4.70	56.00	DNF	7133	
21	Dave Johnson	United States	11.16	6.65	14.61	1.97	50.78	15.07	46.56	NM	68.08	DNF	6378	
22	Marco Baffi	Italy	11.27	6.98	12.35	1.94	50.00	15.93	38.70	NM	39.44	4:54.15	6209	
	Mikhail Medved	Soviet Union	11.25	7.26	16.17	2.00	50.33	14.96	49.94	NM	DNS	–	DNF	
	Henrik Dagård	Sweden	10.88	7.29	13.19	1.97	48.29	14.96	41.16	DNS	–	–	DNF	
	Pedro da Silva	Brazil	11.16	7.12	14.39	1.94	51.18	DNF	DNS	–	–	–	DNF	
	Homelo Vi	Tonga	11.34	6.15	NM	1.82	DQ	DNS	–	–	–	–	DNF	
	Dezső Szabó	Hungary	11.06	NM	DNS	–	–	–	–	–	–	–	DNF	
	Lee Fu-an	Chinese Taipei	DNS	–	–	–	–	–	–	–	–	–	DNS	
	Anthony Brannen	Great Britain	DNS	–	–	–	–	–	–	–	–	–	DNS	
	Viktor Radchenko	Soviet Union	DNS	–	–	–	–	–	–	–	–	–	DNS	

== See also ==
- 1988 Men's Olympic Decathlon
- 1990 Men's European Championships Decathlon
- 1991 Hypo-Meeting
- 1991 Decathlon Year Ranking
- 1992 Men's Olympic Decathlon
