= 1995 in the decathlon =

This page lists the World Best Year Performance in the year 1995 in the men's decathlon. One of the main events during this season were the 1995 World Championships in Gothenburg, Sweden.

== Records ==
Standing records prior to the 1995 season in track and field
World Record	Dan O'Brien (USA)	8891	September 5, 1992	Talence, France

== 1995 World Year Ranking ==
Rank	Points	Athlete	Venue	Date	Note
1	8695	Dan O'Brien (USA)	Göteborg, Sweden	1995-08-07	
2	8575	Erki Nool (EST)	Götzis, Austria	1995-05-28	
3	8489	Eduard Hämäläinen (BLR)	Göteborg, Sweden	1995-08-07	
4	8419	Michael Smith (CAN)	Göteborg, Sweden	1995-08-07	
5	8353	Steve Fritz (USA)	Manhattan, United States	1995-10-01	
6	8351	Chris Huffins (USA)	Sacramento, United States	1995-04-21	
7	8347	Tomáš Dvořák (CZE)	Valladolid, Spain	1995-07-02	
8	8322	Dave Johnson (USA)	Azusa, United States	1995-04-14	
9	8302	Michael Kohnle (GER)	Götzis, Austria	1995-05-28	PB
10	8286	Lev Lobodin (RUS)	Talence, France	1995-09-16	
11	8282	Alain Blondel (FRA)	Talence, France	1995-09-16	
12	8273	Sébastien Levicq (FRA)	Talence, France	1995-09-16	
13	8257	Brian Brophy (USA)	Sacramento, United States	1995-04-21	
14	8248	Jón Arnar Magnússon (ISL)	Talence, France	1995-09-16	
15	8221	Eugenio Balanqué (CUB)	Santiago de Cuba, Cuba	1995-01-26	PB
16	8217	Christian Plaziat (FRA)	Talence, France	1995-09-16	
17	8214	Ricky Barker (USA)	Sacramento, United States	1995-04-21	
18	8199	Paul Meier (GER)	Helmond, Netherlands	1995-07-02	
19	8172	Mario Sategna (USA)	Knoxville, United States	1995-06-01	PB
20	8164	Thorsten Dauth (GER)	Götzis, Austria	1995-05-28	PB
21	8135	Andrew Fucci (USA)	College Station, United States	1995-03-17	
22	8131	Alex Kruger (GBR)	Valladolid, Spain	1995-07-02	PB
23	8131	Indrek Kaseorg (EST)	Helmond, Netherlands	1995-07-02	
24	8129	Dan Steele (USA)	Sacramento, United States	1995-04-21	PB
25	8122	Frank Müller (GER)	Ratingen, Germany	1995-07-30	

== See also ==
- 1995 Hypo-Meeting
- 1995 Décastar
