= 1990 European Athletics Championships – Men's decathlon =

Men's decathlon at the European Athletics Championships

The men's decathlon competition at the 1990 European Athletics Championships in Split, Yugoslavia, was held at Stadion Poljud on 28 August and 29 August 1990.

== Medalists ==
Gold	Christian Plaziat; France (FRA)
Silver	Dezső Szabó; Hungary (HUN)
Bronze	Christian Schenk; East Germany (GDR)

== Schedule ==
28 August
1. 100 m
2. Long jump
3. Shot put
4. High jump
5. 400 m

29 August
6. 110 m hurdles
7. Discus throw
8. Pole vault
9. Javelin throw
10. 1,500 m

== Records ==
World record	Daley Thompson (GBR)	8847	9 August 1984	Los Angeles, United States
Event record	Daley Thompson (GBR)	8811	28 August 1986	Stuttgart, West Germany

=== Results ===
The highest mark recorded in each event is highlighted in yellow

Rank	Name	100m	LJ	SP	HJ	400m	110m H	DT	PV	JT	1500m	Points
1st place, gold medalist(s)	Christian Plaziat (FRA)	10.72	7.77	14.19	2.10	47.10	13.98	44.36	5.00	54.72	4:27.83	8574
2nd place, silver medalist(s)	Dezső Szabó (HUN)	11.06	7.49	13.65	1.98	47.17	14.67	40.78	5.30	61.94	4:11.07	8436
3rd place, bronze medalist(s)	Christian Schenk (GDR)	11.26	7.55	15.59	2.22	49.03	15.24	47.34	4.40	61.62	4:13.77	8433
4	Robert Změlík (TCH)	10.86	7.90	12.60	2.01	48.25	14.12	39.00	4.90	59.28	4:27.76	8249
5	Alain Blondel (FRA)	11.06	7.39	13.05	1.95	48.04	14.27	43.86	4.90	56.24	4:09.90	8216
6	Antonio Peñalver (ESP)	11.24	7.55	16.01	2.01	50.27	14.63	47.84	4.70	57.48	4:28.86	8214
7	Beat Gähwiler (SUI)	11.29	7.42	13.41	1.98	49.21	14.65	44.30	4.70	62.94	4:12.88	8146
8	Andrei Nazarov (URS)	11.04	7.43	13.07	2.13	48.09	14.56	41.82	4.60	56.56	4:33.88	8072
9	Henrik Dagård (SWE)	10.93	7.44	12.39	1.98	46.95	14.63	39.72	4.70	63.54	4:34.46	8052
10	Frank Müller (FRG)	11.00	7.32	13.92	1.98	47.98	14.64	41.46	4.40	59.78	4:29.29	7973
11	Michael Kohnle (FRG)	10.89	7.24	14.41	1.98	49.63	14.80	42.18	4.70	61.74	5:04.05	7829
12	Siegfried Wentz (FRG)	11.28	7.09	14.89	1.98	48.78	14.48	43.20	4.40	56.20	4:39.81	7810
13	Saša Karan (YUG)	11.29	7.07	13.53	1.92	49.13	14.90	44.70	4.40	56.10	4:17.60	7774
14	Gernot Kellermayr (AUT)	10.99	7.32	12.96	1.86	48.92	14.87	40.64	4.40	58.86	4:35.61	7666
15	Goran Kabić (YUG)	11.56	6.94	13.85	1.89	51.86	14.87	43.66	4.30	65.12	4:26.38	7584
16	Eugene Gilkes (GBR)	11.19	6.80	13.84	1.83	48.91	15.31	46.30	4.20	53.20	4:19.42	7555
17	Michael Arnold (AUT)	11.20	7.23	13.39	1.98	49.63	14.81	37.74	4.00	59.46	4:39.77	7515
18	Álvaro Burrell (ESP)	11.09	6.68	13.36	1.95	48.06	14.93	42.36	4.10	47.08	4:29.55	7443
19	Kaj Ekman (FIN)	11.20	6.52	12.35	1.95	49.10	14.86	40.84	4.00	56.80	4:22.36	7415
20	Alex Kruger (GBR)	11.49	6.85	13.48	2.07	50.35	15.39	40.30	4.30	52.74	4:43.77	7359
	Mikhail Medved (URS)	11.14 (w: 0.0 m/s)	7.39 (w: 1.2 m/s)	15.61	2.01	49.42	14.42 (w: 0.7 m/s)	48.58	NM			DNF
	Sándór Munkácsi (HUN)	11.17 (w: 0.0 m/s)	6.83 (w: 1.4 m/s)	12.13	1.95	49.40	14.69 (w: 0.7 m/s)	39.34	NM			DNF
	Alper Kasapoğlu (TUR)	11.38 (w: 0.2 m/s)	7.08 (w: 0.4 m/s)	12.31	1.89	49.81	15.09 (w: 0.0 m/s)	38.90	NM			DNF
	Sten Ekberg (SWE)	11.29 (w: 0.2 m/s)	6.85 (w: 0.6 m/s)	13.40	1.86							DNF
	René Schmidheiny (SUI)	11.88 (w: 0.2 m/s)	6.75 (w: 0.7 m/s)	14.84	1.83							DNF
	Robert de Wit (NED)	11.14 (w: 0.0 m/s)	7.17 (w: 1.0 m/s)	13.42	NH							DNF
	Aleksey Lyakh (URS)	11.57 (w: -0.2 m/s)	NM	15.12								DNF
	Thomas Halamoda (GDR)	11.12 (w: -0.2 m/s)	NM									DNF
	Petri Keskitalo (FIN)	11.27 (w: -0.6 m/s)										DNF

== Participation ==
According to an unofficial count, 29 athletes from 15 countries participated in the event.

- Austria (2)
- Czechoslovakia (1)
- East Germany (3)
- Finland (2)
- France (2)
- Hungary (2)
- Netherlands (1)
- Soviet Union (3)
- Spain (2)
- Sweden (2)
- Switzerland (2)
- Turkey (1)
- United Kingdom (2)
- West Germany (2)
- Yugoslavia (2)

== See also ==
- Athletics at the 1988 Summer Olympics – Men's decathlon
- 1990 Hypo-Meeting
- 1990 Decathlon Year Ranking
- 1991 World Championships in Athletics – Men's decathlon
