= 1990 Hypo-Meeting =

The 16th edition of the annual Hypo-Meeting took place on June 16 and June 17, 1990 in Götzis, Austria. The track and field competition featured a decathlon (men) and a heptathlon (women) event.

== Men's Decathlon ==
=== Schedule ===
June 16
1. 100 m
2. Long Jump
3. Shot Put
4. High Jump
5. 400 m

June 17
6. 110 m hurdles
7. Discus Throw
8. Pole Vault
9. Javelin Throw
10. 1,500 m

=== Records ===
World Record	Daley Thompson (GBR)	8847	August 9, 1984	Los Angeles, United States
Event Record	Daley Thompson (GBR)	8730	May 23, 1982	Götzis, Austria

=== Results ===
Rank	Athlete	Decathlon										Points
Rank	Athlete	1	2	3	4	5	6	7	8	9	10	Points
1	Christian Schenk (GDR)	11,36	7.73	15.58	2.23	49,68	15,29	48.12	4.80	63.74	4.30,18	8481
2	Dezső Szabó (HUN)	11,05	7.51	13.31	2.05	47,25	14,52	39.06	5.20	58.38	4.21,83	8306
3	Siegfried Wentz (FRG)	10,98	7.28	14.94	2.02	48,85	14,26	41.82	4.70	60.08	4.34,51	8138
4	Petri Keskitalo (FIN)	10,93	7.65	14.42	1.99	49,93	14,50	39.04	4.90	60.32	4.49,99	8012
5	Henrik Dagård (SWE)	10,88	7.32	13.21	2.05	47,88	14,64	41.06	4.70	63.28	4.54,08	8004
6	Beat Gähwiler (SUI)	11,35	7.10	13.83	1.93	49,42	14,69	41.40	4.80	63.96	4.14,96	7995
7	Frank Müller (FRG)	11,03	7.57	13.63	2.05	48,43	14,65	38.68	4.50	57.66	4.35,45	7952
8	Aleksei Lyakh (URS)	11,36	7.55	15.24	2.05	51,49	14,96	43.42	5.00	64.54	5.07,55	7951
9	Michael Kohnle (FRG)	10,95	7.20	15.08	1.99	48,74	14,43	40.90	4.50	60.62	4.49,27	7930
10	Norbert Demmel (FRG)	11,40	6.83	15.96	1.90	49,71	14,78	50.04	4.60	58.38	4.32,89	7915
11	Lars Warming (DEN)	11,11	7.35	13.71	1.96	48,11	14,63	40.16	4.80	50.28	4.23,64	7908
12	Gernot Kellermayr (AUT)	10,67	7.46	13.95	1.93	48,52	14,61	40.56	4.60	56.94	4.46,41	7904
13	Igor Maryin (URS)	11,12	7.18	14.62	1.96	51,19	15,36	47.78	4.60	60.50	4.36,69	7852
14	Robert de Wit (NED)	11,25	6.82	14.70	1.90	49,62	14,53	43.06	4.60	58.04	4.38,20	7718
15	Stefan Schneider (SUI)	11,46	7.05	12.79	2.05	50,42	14,92	40.14	4.60	57.88	4.25,74	7681
16	Sándór Munkácsi (HUN)	11,18	7.12	12.58	1.96	48,88	14,63	38.18	4.40	53.44	4.25,56	7607
17	Karl-Heinz Fichtner (FRG)	11,37	7.02	14.74	1.96	51,26	15,62	40.02	5.00	56.30	4.44,94	7579
18	Csaba Fábián (HUN)	11,24	7.24	12.92	1.96	50,29	14,88	36.56	4.50	54.54	4.30,67	7524
19	René Schmidheiny (SUI)	11,66	6.86	15.48	1.93	53,32	15,30	45.36	4.30	65.52	4.42,91	7500
20	Michael Arnold (AUT)	10,95	7.30	12.64	1.93	50,20	15,34	42.54	4.10	57.76	4.55,39	7409
21	Alper Kasapoglu (TUR)	11,20	7.36	13.25	1.90	50,70	14,58	36.92	4.40	51.12	4.45,00	7384
22	Knut Harald Gundersen (NOR)	11,57	6.88	14.00	1.93	51,92	15,30	43.90	4.00	57.12	4.41,75	7258
23	Martin Krenn (AUT)	11,58	6.62	14.07	1.90	50,76	15,53	38.88	4.40	56.12	4.39,19	7213
24	Matiaz Polak (YUG)	11,34	6.40	13.46	1.84	52,12	15,64	39.18	4.20	52.98	4.50,11	6882
—	Mikhail Medved (URS)	11,15	7.35	15.88	2.08	51,63	14,69	45.54	4.80	50.68	—	DNF
—	Sten Ekberg (SWE)	11,25	6.93	13.71	2.02	49,66	15,10	46.90	4.50	58.10	—	DNF

== Women's Heptathlon ==
=== Schedule ===
June 16
1. 100 m hurdles
2. High Jump
3. Shot Put
4. 200 m

June 17
5. Long Jump
6. Javelin Throw
7. 800 m

=== Records ===
World Record	Jackie Joyner-Kersee (USA)	7291	September 24, 1988	Seoul, South Korea
Event Record	Jackie Joyner-Kersee (USA)	6841	May 25, 1986	Götzis, Austria

== See also ==
- 1990 Decathlon Year Ranking
- 1990 European Championships in Athletics – Men's Decathlon
- 1990 European Championships in Athletics – Women's heptathlon
