= Athletics at the 1989 Summer Universiade – Men's decathlon =

The men's decathlon event at the 1989 Summer Universiade was held at the Wedaustadion in Duisburg on 26 and 27 August 1989.

== Results ==
The highest mark recorded in each event is highlighted in yellow

Rank	Athlete	Nationality	100m	LJ	SP	HJ	400m	110m H	DT	PV	JT	1500m	Points	Notes
1st place, gold medalist(s)	Dave Johnson	United States	11.07	7.10	14.56	1.94	48.94	14.36	47.28	4.90	64.60	4:32.72	8216	
2nd place, silver medalist(s)	Mikhail Medved	Soviet Union	11.11	7.38	14.79	2.06	50.97	14.52	51.26	4.80	57.40	4:59.60	8062	
3rd place, bronze medalist(s)	Dezsõ Szabó	Hungary	11.02	7.11	13.43	1.97	48.10	14.74	39.92	5.10	56.44	4:22.77	8031	
4	Sheldon Blockburger	United States	11.01	7.45	13.93	2.09	50.00	14.60	40.56	4.70	59.92	4:58.39	7906	
5	Robert Změlík	Czechoslovakia	11.14	7.18	13.36	2.09	51.08	14.05	40.56	4.60	53.86	4:39.31	7793	
6	Sven Reintak	Soviet Union	11.66	6.88	13.25	1.94	51.01	14.72	42.64	4.80	64.22	4:26.78	7723	
7	Bengt Järlsjö	Sweden	11.35	6.66	16.01	1.94	51.56	14.70	47.12	4.90	55.46	4:56.46	7690	
8	Dariusz Grad	Poland	10.96	6.75	13.44	2.00	49.13	14.59	39.98	4.60	50.28	4:27.81	7683	
9	Jürgen Hoppe	West Germany	11.21	7.12	13.80	1.88	48.71	14.67	41.90	4.40	55.88	4:36.47	7646	
10	Simon Shirley	Australia	10.93	7.30	13.51	2.03	48.89	15.60	43.70	4.20	56.04	4:50.57	7641	
11	Anthony Brannen	Great Britain	11.24	7.09	12.57	2.00	49.44	14.35	34.60	4.50	50.14	4:35.30	7475	
12	Gong Guohua	China	11.45	7.04	13.83	1.88	51.88	15.64	45.54	4.80	52.90	4:55.76	7347	
13	Christian Deick	West Germany	11.14	6.72	14.57	1.88	50.56	15.41	40.22	4.20	53.74	4:50.82	7227	
14	Qun Ding	China	11.50	6.83	13.50	2.00	53.10	14.80	41.18	4.10	58.14	4:54.95	7212	
15	Stuart Andrews	Australia	11.38	6.77	13.36	1.82	49.96	15.51	47.48	NM	52.14	4:54.37	6507	
	Álvaro Burrell	Spain	??.??	?.??	?.??	?.??	DNS	–	–	–	–	–	DNF	
	Paul Buscail	Spain	??.??	?.??	?.??	?.??	DNS	–	–	–	–	–	DNF	
	Carlos O'Connell	Ireland	–	–	–	–	–	–	–	–	–	–	DNF	
	Michael Arnold	Austria	–	–	–	–	–	–	–	–	–	–	DNF	
	Saša Karan	Yugoslavia	–	–	–	–	–	–	–	–	–	–	DNF	
