= 1995 IAAF World Indoor Championships – Men's heptathlon =

The men's heptathlon event at the 1995 IAAF World Indoor Championships was held on 11–12 March.

== Medalists ==
Gold	Silver	Bronze
Christian Plaziat; France	Tomáš Dvořák; Czech Republic	Henrik Dagård; Sweden

== Results ==
=== 60 metres ===
Rank	Heat	Name	Nationality	Time	Points	Notes
1	1	Erki Nool	Estonia	6.81	951	
2	2	Henrik Dagård	Sweden	6.84	940	
3	2	Sheldon Blockburger	United States	6.92	911	
4	2	Christian Plaziat	France	6.96	897	
5	2	Tomáš Dvořák	Czech Republic	7.02	875	
6	2	Ricky Barker	United States	7.02	875	
6	2	Petri Keskitalo	Finland	7.02	875	
8	1	Zsolt Kürtösi	Hungary	7.10	847	
9	1	Antonio Peñalver	Spain	7.15	830	
10	1	Alex Kruger	Great Britain	7.16	826	
11	1	Robert Wärff	Sweden	7.19	816	
12	1	Sébastien Levicq	France	7.22	806	

=== Long jump ===
Rank	Athlete	Nationality	#1	#2	#3	Result	Points	Notes	Total
1	Erki Nool	Estonia	7.49	7.56	x	7.56	950		1901
2	Christian Plaziat	France	7.52	x	x	7.52	940		1837
3	Sheldon Blockburger	United States	7.37	7.36	7.33	7.37	940		1814
4	Tomáš Dvořák	Czech Republic	7.27	7.36	x	7.36	940		1775
5	Antonio Peñalver	Spain	7.34	x	x	7.34	896		1726
5	Petri Keskitalo	Finland	7.34	x	x	7.34	896		1771
7	Henrik Dagård	Sweden	7.32	7.10	7.15	7.32	891		1831
8	Ricky Barker	United States	7.26	6.99	7.19	7.26	876		1751
9	Alex Kruger	Great Britain	5.89	x	7.23	7.23	869		1695
10	Zsolt Kürtösi	Hungary	7.00	6.96	7.11	7.11	840		1687
11	Robert Wärff	Sweden	7.02	7.06	x	7.06	828		1644
12	Sébastien Levicq	France	4.74	6.58	6.93	6.93	797		1603

=== Shot put ===
Rank	Athlete	Nationality	#1	#2	#3	Result	Points	Notes	Total
1	Antonio Peñalver	Spain	15.97	16.15	x	16.15	861		2587
2	Tomáš Dvořák	Czech Republic	15.84	15.62	x	15.84	841		2616
3	Robert Wärff	Sweden	15.33	x	14.76	15.33	810		2454
4	Henrik Dagård	Sweden	15.27	14.85	15.12	15.27	810		2637
5	Sheldon Blockburger	United States	14.94	14.73	x	14.94	786		2600
6	Christian Plaziat	France	14.86	x	14.92	14.92	785		2622
7	Petri Keskitalo	Finland	14.05	14.80	x	14.80	777		2548
8	Alex Kruger	Great Britain	14.79	x	x	14.79	777		2472
9	Ricky Barker	United States	14.60	14.62	x	14.62	766		2517
10	Sébastien Levicq	France	13.67	14.33	x	14.33	749		2352
11	Zsolt Kürtösi	Hungary	13.79	13.75	13.78	13.79	715		2402
12	Erki Nool	Estonia	x	x	10.46	10.46	513		2414

=== High jump ===
Rank	Athlete	Nationality	1.86	1.89	1.92	1.95	1.98	2.01	2.04	2.07	2.10	2.13	2.16	2.19	Result	Points	Notes	Total
1	Alex Kruger	Great Britain	–	–	–	–	–	o	–	o	o	o	o	xxx	2.16	953		3425
2	Ricky Barker	United States	–	–	–	–	–	o	–	o	o	o	xxx		2.13	925		3442
3	Sheldon Blockburger	United States	–	–	–	–	o	–	o	o	xxx				2.07	868		3468
4	Christian Plaziat	France	–	–	–	o	–	o	o	xxx					2.04	840		3462
5	Zsolt Kürtösi	Hungary	–	o	–	o	–	xo	o	xxx					2.04	840		3242
6	Tomáš Dvořák	Czech Republic	xo	–	o	o	o	o	xo	xxx					2.04	840		3456
7	Antonio Peñalver	Spain	o	–	o	o	o	xo	xxo	xxx					2.04	840		3427
8	Erki Nool	Estonia	–	o	o	o	o	xxo	xxo	xxx					2.04	840		3254
9	Robert Wärff	Sweden	o	–	o	xo	o	xxx							1.98	785		3239
10	Sébastien Levicq	France	o	–	o	o	xxo	xxx							1.98	785		3137
11	Petri Keskitalo	Finland	o	o	xo	xo	xxo	xxx							1.98	785		3333
12	Henrik Dagård	Sweden	xo	o	xxo	xxo	xxo	xxx							1.98	785		3422

=== 60 metres hurdles ===
Rank	Heat	Name	Nationality	Time	Points	Notes	Total
1	2	Christian Plaziat	France	7.85	1020		4482
2	2	Henrik Dagård	Sweden	7.87	1015		4437
3	2	Tomáš Dvořák	Czech Republic	7.93	999		4455
4	2	Ricky Barker	United States	8.05	969		4411
5	1	Antonio Peñalver	Spain	8.16	942		4369
6	1	Zsolt Kürtösi	Hungary	8.25	920		4162
6	2	Sheldon Blockburger	United States	8.25	920		4388
8	2	Petri Keskitalo	Finland	8.26	917		4250
9	1	Erki Nool	Estonia	8.32	903		4157
10	1	Sébastien Levicq	France	8.33	900		4037
11	1	Alex Kruger	Great Britain	8.36	893		4318
12	1	Robert Wärff	Sweden	8.40	884		4123

=== Pole vault ===
Rank	Athlete	Nationality	4.20	4.30	4.40	4.50	4.60	4.70	4.80	4.90	5.00	5.10	5.20	5.30	5.40	Result	Points	Notes	Total
1	Sébastien Levicq	France	–	–	–	–	–	–	o	–	o	–	xo	o	xxx	5.30	1004		5041
2	Christian Plaziat	France	–	–	–	–	o	–	o	o	o	o	xxx			5.10	941		5423
3	Ricky Barker	United States	–	–	–	–	–	o	–	o	o	xo	xxx			5.10	941		5352
4	Erki Nool	Estonia	–	–	–	–	–	–	–	–	xo	xxx				5.00	910		5067
5	Alex Kruger	Great Britain	–	–	o	–	o	o	o	o	xxx					4.90	880		5198
6	Zsolt Kürtösi	Hungary	–	o	o	xo	xo	xo	o	xxx						4.80	849		5011
7	Henrik Dagård	Sweden	–	–	o	–	o	o	xo	x						4.80	849		5286
7	Tomáš Dvořák	Czech Republic	o	–	o	–	o	o	xo	x						4.80	849		5304
9	Antonio Peñalver	Spain	–	o	–	o	o	o	xxx							4.70	819		5188
10	Robert Wärff	Sweden	xxo	o	xo	o	xxo	xxx								4.60	790		4913
	Petri Keskitalo	Finland	–	–	–	–	–	–	xxx							NM	0		4250
	Sheldon Blockburger	United States	–	–	–	xxx										NM	0		4388

=== 1000 metres ===
Rank	Name	Nationality	Time	Points	Notes
1	Tomáš Dvořák	Czech Republic	2:40.80	865	
2	Henrik Dagård	Sweden	2:41.60	856	
3	Robert Wärff	Sweden	2:43.25	838	
4	Sébastien Levicq	France	2:44.07	829	
5	Christian Plaziat	France	2:44.56	823	
6	Zsolt Kürtösi	Hungary	2:44.88	820	
7	Erki Nool	Estonia	2:44.89	820	
8	Alex Kruger	Great Britain	2:48.66	780	
9	Ricky Barker	United States	2:49.72	768	
10	Antonio Peñalver	Spain	2:51.41	751	
11	Sheldon Blockburger	United States	2:52.60	739	
	Petri Keskitalo	Finland	DNS	0	

=== Final standings ===
The highest mark recorded in each event is highlighted in yellow

Rank	Athlete	Nationality	60m	LJ	SP	HJ	60m H	PV	1000m	Points	Notes
1st place, gold medalist(s)	Christian Plaziat	France	6.96	7.52	14.92	2.04	7.85	5.10	2:44.56	6246	
2nd place, silver medalist(s)	Tomáš Dvořák	Czech Republic	7.02	7.36	15.84	2.04	7.93	4.80	2:40.80	6169	
3rd place, bronze medalist(s)	Henrik Dagård	Sweden	6.84	7.32	15.27	1.98	7.87	4.80	2:41.60	6142	NR
4	Ricky Barker	United States	7.02	7.26	14.62	2.13	8.05	5.10	2:49.72	6120	
5	Alex Kruger	Great Britain	7.16	7.23	14.79	2.16	8.36	4.90	2:48.66	5978	
6	Antonio Peñalver	Spain	7.15	7.34	16.15	2.04	8.16	4.70	2:51.41	5939	
7	Erki Nool	Estonia	6.81	7.56	10.46	2.04	8.32	5.00	2:44.89	5887	
8	Sébastien Levicq	France	7.22	6.93	14.33	1.98	8.33	5.30	2:44.07	5870	
9	Zsolt Kürtösi	Hungary	7.10	7.11	13.79	2.04	8.25	4.80	2:44.88	5831	
10	Robert Wärff	Sweden	7.19	7.06	15.33	1.98	8.40	4.60	2:43.25	5751	
11	Sheldon Blockburger	United States	6.92	7.37	14.94	2.07	8.25	NM	2:52.60	5127	
11	Petri Keskitalo	Finland	7.02	7.34	14.80	1.98	8.26	NM	DNS	DNF	
