= 1993 IAAF World Indoor Championships – Men's heptathlon =

The men's heptathlon event at the 1993 IAAF World Indoor Championships was held on 13 and 14 March. Held for the first time, heptathlon was a non-championship event at this edition and the medals awarded did not count towards the total medal status.

== Results ==
The highest mark recorded in each event is highlighted in yellow

Rank	Athlete	Nationality	60m	LJ	SP	HJ	60m H	PV	1000m	Points	Notes
1st place, gold medalist(s)	Dan O'Brien	United States	6.67	7.84	16.02	2.13	7.85	5.20	2:57.96	6476	WR
2nd place, silver medalist(s)	Mike Smith	Canada	7.06	7.49	15.97	2.10	7.98	5.10	2:45.55	6279	
3rd place, bronze medalist(s)	Eduard Hämäläinen	Belarus	7.08	7.39	14.50	2.01	7.93	5.20	2:49.54	6075	
4	Lev Lobodin	Ukraine	6.89	7.13	14.99	2.10	7.98	4.80	2:53.51	6017	
5	Dezső Szabó	Hungary	7.15	7.31	13.01	1.98	8.45	5.40	2:55.24	5790	
6	William Motti	France	7.46	6.91	14.91	2.13	8.66	4.80	3:05.82	5507	
	Alain Blondel	France	7.17	7.27	13.92	1.95	8.18	5.00	DNS	DNF	
	Andrei Nazarov	Estonia	6.98	7.16	13.85	2.01	8.07	NM	DNS	DNF	
	Álvaro Burrell	Spain	6.99	7.09	14.22	1.98	8.78	NM	DNS	DNF	
	Robert Změlík	Czech Republic	6.96	7.57	13.84	1.86	DNS	–	–	DNF	
	Brian Brophy	United States	7.20	7.08	15.13	1.98	DNS	–	–	DNF	
	Sándor Munkácsi	Hungary	7.14	6.54	11.31	NM	DNS	–	–	DNF	
