= 1988 Hypo-Meeting =

The 14th annual Hypo-Meeting took place on 18 and 19 June 1988 in Götzis, Austria. The track and field competition featured a decathlon (men) and a heptathlon (women) event.

== Men's Decathlon ==
=== Schedule ===
18 June
1. 100 m
2. Long Jump
3. Shot Put
4. High Jump
5. 400 m

19 June
6. 110 m hurdles
7. Discus Throw
8. Pole Vault
9. Javelin Throw
10. 1,500 m

=== Records ===
| World Record | Daley Thompson (GBR) | 8847 | 9 August 1984 | Los Angeles, United States |
| Event Record | Daley Thompson (GBR) | 8730 | 23 May 1982 | Götzis, Austria |

=== Results ===
| Rank | Athlete | Decathlon | | | | | | | | | | Points |
| Rank | Athlete | 1 | 2 | 3 | 4 | 5 | 6 | 7 | 8 | 9 | 10 | Points |
|---|---|---|---|---|---|---|---|---|---|---|---|---|
| 1 | Uwe Freimuth (GDR) | 11,18 | 7.68 | 15.80 | 1.96 | 48,77 | 14,88 | 47.96 | 4.90 | 62.84 | 4.29,37 | 8381 |
| 2 | Dave Steen (CAN) | 11,01 | 7.78 | 13.35 | 1.99 | 47,70 | 14,71 | 42.86 | 5.10 | 60.06 | 4.21,10 | 8362 |
| 3 | Thomas Fahner (GDR) | 11,04 | 7.55 | 15.01 | 1.93 | 47,94 | 14,54 | 46.66 | 4.60 | 68.40 | 4.27,77 | 8362 |
| 4 | Christian Plaziat (FRA) | 10,81 | 7.53 | 14.57 | 2.08 | 47,73 | 14,34 | 43.02 | 4.90 | 53.70 | 4.27,73 | 8349 |
| 5 | Christian Schenk (GDR) | 11,36 | 7.71 | 14.76 | 2.20 | 49,23 | 14,99 | 44.86 | 4.40 | 61.38 | 4.16,02 | 8330 |
| 6 | Pavel Tarnavetskiy (URS) | 11,03 | 7.35 | 15.49 | 1.99 | 48,19 | 14,90 | 45.86 | 5.00 | 58.72 | 4.28,09 | 8299 |
| 7 | Karl-Heinz Fichtner (FRG) | 11,11 | 7.75 | 15.39 | 1.99 | 49,19 | 15,03 | 43.50 | 5.10 | 56.44 | 4.29,22 | 8250 |
| 8 | Beat Gähwiler (SUI) | 11,23 | 7.57 | 13.49 | 1.99 | 48,70 | 14,56 | 43.82 | 4.70 | 64.24 | 4.14,77 | 8244 |
| 9 | Ivan Babi (URS) | 10,96 | 7.56 | 14.51 | 2.02 | 48,72 | 14,07 | 41.50 | 4.80 | 54.12 | 4.29,58 | 8183 |
| 10 | Jürgen Hingsen (FRG) | 11,17 | 7.65 | 15.48 | 1.96 | 49,52 | 14,64 | 44.84 | 4.40 | 62.32 | 4.28,74 | 8133 |
| 11 | Rainer Sonnenburg (FRG) | 10,88 | 7.69 | 15.24 | 1.96 | 50,00 | 14,51 | 45.16 | 4.20 | 62.68 | 4.38,15 | 8079 |
| 12 | Michael Smith (CAN) | 10,99 | 7.34 | 14.21 | 1.99 | 48,56 | 14,62 | 43.54 | 4.40 | 60.00 | 4.27,54 | 8039 |
| 13 | Lars Warming (DEN) | 11,08 | 7.31 | 13.54 | 1.93 | 48,03 | 14,34 | 42.60 | 4.70 | 51.94 | 4.17,35 | 7994 |
| 14 | Stephan Kallenberg (FRG) | 10,99 | 7.62 | 14.10 | 1.87 | 48,87 | 15,34 | 47.26 | 4.50 | 63.58 | 4.47,76 | 7922 |
| 15 | Dezső Szabó (HUN) | 11,09 | 7.38 | 12.63 | 1.99 | 47,98 | 14,98 | 38.04 | 4.80 | 56.64 | 4.30,11 | 7852 |
| 16 | Staffan Blomstrand (SWE) | 11,17 | 6.96 | 14.45 | 1.87 | 47,57 | 15,62 | 44.60 | 4.60 | 60.84 | 4.31,55 | 7809 |
| 17 | Gary Kinder (USA) | 11,08 | 7.49 | 16.05 | 1.90 | 50,18 | 14,87 | 44.52 | 4.50 | 66.08 | 5.25,97 | 7780 |
| 18 | Marco Rossi (ITA) | 10,94 | 7.05 | 13.80 | 1.96 | 49,11 | 14,52 | 42.34 | 4.30 | 51.30 | 4.22,95 | 7761 |
| 19 | Norbert Demmel (FRG) | 11,27 | 6.76 | 14.99 | 1.96 | 49,92 | 14,76 | 48.52 | 4.20 | 56.02 | 4.29,01 | 7753 |
| 20 | Gernot Kellermayr (AUT) | 11,13 | 7.09 | 12.62 | 1.93 | 49,30 | 14,85 | 39.76 | 4.50 | 55.58 | 4.34,00 | 7577 |
| 21 | Patrick Gellens (FRA) | 11,20 | 7.15 | 13.10 | 1.96 | 50,02 | 16,14 | 40.62 | 4.90 | 53.86 | 4.32,47 | 7569 |
| 22 | Jan Trefny (SUI) | 11,30 | 7.04 | 13.05 | 1.90 | 48,45 | 14,76 | 39.86 | 4.00 | 54.76 | 4.12,65 | 7568 |
| 23 | Dag Frode Skogheim (NOR) | 11,34 | 6.96 | 11.85 | 1.96 | 49,32 | 15,27 | 35.86 | 4.20 | 47.94 | 4.29,83 | 7175 |
| 24 | Sándor Munkácsi (HUN) | 11,33 | 7.12 | 11.46 | 1.84 | 49,54 | 15,10 | 37.18 | 4.00 | 48.64 | 4.26,41 | 7099 |
| 25 | Wolfgang Spann (AUT) | 11,58 | 6.60 | 13.98 | 1.81 | 52,02 | 15,00 | 38.46 | 4.20 | 63.36 | 4.56,00 | 7071 |
| 26 | Robert Pracher (AUT) | 11,17 | 6.77 | 13.54 | 1.84 | 52,93 | 15,26 | 40.44 | 4.50 | 43.10 | 4.41,00 | 7042 |
| — | Michael Arnold (AUT) | 11,04 | DNS | — | — | — | — | — | — | — | — | DNF |

== Women's Heptathlon ==
=== Schedule ===
18 June
1. 100 m hurdles
2. High Jump
3. Shot Put
4. 200 m

19 June
5. Long Jump
6. Javelin Throw
7. 800 m

=== Records ===
| World Record | Jackie Joyner-Kersee (USA) | 7158 | 2 August 1986 | Houston, United States |
| Event Record | Jackie Joyner-Kersee (USA) | 6841 | 25 May 1986 | Götzis, Austria |

== See also ==
- Athletics at the 1988 Summer Olympics – Men's decathlon
- Athletics at the 1988 Summer Olympics – Women's heptathlon
