= 1987 World Championships in Athletics – Men's decathlon =

These are the official results of the Men's Decathlon competition at the 1987 World Championships in Rome, Italy. There were a total number of 28 participating athletes, including ten non-finishers. The competition started on September 3, 1987, and ended on September 4, 1987.

== Medalists ==
Gold	Torsten Voss; East Germany (GDR)
Silver	Siegfried Wentz; West Germany (FRG)
Bronze	Pavel Tarnavetskiy; Soviet Union (URS)

== Schedule ==
Thursday, September 3
1. 100 m
2. Long Jump
3. Shot Put
4. High Jump
5. 400 m

Friday, September 4
6. 110 m hurdles
7. Discus Throw
8. Pole Vault
9. Javelin Throw
10. 1,500 m

== Records ==
Standing records prior to the 1987 World Athletics Championships
World Record	Daley Thompson (GBR)	8847	August 9, 1984	Los Angeles, United States
Event Record	Daley Thompson (GBR)	8714	August 13, 1983	Helsinki, Finland
Season Best	Siegfried Wentz (FRG)	8645	May 24, 1987	Götzis, Austria
Broken records during the 1987 World Athletics Championships
Season Best	Torsten Voss (GDR)	8680	September 4, 1987	Rome, Italy

== Final ==
RANK	FINAL RANKING	POINTS
	Torsten Voss (GDR)	8680
	Siegfried Wentz (FRG)	8461
	Pavel Tarnavetskiy (URS)	8375
4.	Christian Plaziat (FRA)	8307
5.	Christian Schenk (GDR)	8304
6.	Simon Poelman (NZL)	8296
7.	Alain Blondel (FRA)	8178
8.	Aleksandr Nevskiy (URS)	8174
9.	Daley Thompson (GBR)	8124
10.	William Motti (FRA)	8062
11.	Beat Gähwiler (SUI)	8034
12.	Gary Kinder (USA)	8030
13.	Rob Muzzio (USA)	8017
14.	Michael Neugebauer (FRG)	7733
15.	Mikael Olander (SWE)	7696
16.	Veroslav Valenta (TCH)	7574
17.	Lars Warming (DEN)	7537
18.	Paul Hewlett (IVB)	6474
—	Pedro da Silva (BRA)	DNF
—	Dave Steen (CAN)	DNF
—	Valter Külvet (URS)	DNF
—	Petri Keskitalo (FIN)	DNF
—	Jürgen Hingsen (FRG)	DNF
—	Marco Rossi (ITA)	DNF
—	Lee Fu-an (TPE)	DNF
—	Tim Bright (USA)	DNF
—	Mike Smith (CAN)	DNF
—	Robert de Wit (NED)	DNF

== See also ==
- 1986 Men's European Championships Decathlon
- 1987 Hypo-Meeting
- 1988 Men's Olympic Decathlon
