= 1986 World Junior Championships in Athletics – Men's decathlon =

The men's decathlon event at the 1986 World Junior Championships in Athletics was held in Athens, Greece, at Olympic Stadium on 16 and 17 July. Senior implements (106.7 cm (3'6) hurdles, 7257g shot, 2 kg discus) were used.

== Medalists ==
| Gold | Petri Keskitalo; Finland |
| Silver | Mike Smith; Canada |
| Bronze | Nikolay Zajats; Soviet Union |

== Results ==
=== Final ===
16/17 July

The highest mark recorded in each event is highlighted in yellow

| Rank | Name | Nationality | 100m | LJ | SP | HJ | 400m | 110m H | DT | PV | JT | 1500m | Points | Notes |
|---|---|---|---|---|---|---|---|---|---|---|---|---|---|---|
| 1st place, gold medalist(s) | Petri Keskitalo | Finland | 10.93 (w: 0.9 m/s) | 7.40 | 13.98 | 1.97 | 50.00 | 15.02 (w: 0.8 m/s) | 35.52 | 4.70 | 56.52 | 4:54.34 | 7623 | |
| 2nd place, silver medalist(s) | Mike Smith | Canada | 11.11 (w: 0.8 m/s) | 7.20 | 13.62 | 1.97 | 48.58 | 15.45 (w: 0.3 m/s) | 38.20 | 3.70 | 60.94 | 4:28.95 | 7523 | |
| 3rd place, bronze medalist(s) | Nikolay Zajats | Soviet Union | 11.12 | 7.05 | 12.49 | 1.97 | 49.27 | 15.33 | 39.82 | 4.80 | 50.46 | 4:41.00 | 7509 | |
| 4 | Stefan Haigis | West Germany | 11.46 | 6.91 | 13.71 | 1.94 | 50.62 | 15.78 | 41.78 | 4.20 | 62.60 | 4:36.37 | 7411 | |
| 5 | Michael Kühne | East Germany | 11.41 | 6.90 | 12.08 | 1.91 | 49.63 | 15.64 | 38.02 | 4.40 | 56.52 | 4:19.31 | 7358 | |
| 6 | Oleg Semyonov | Soviet Union | 10.99 | 6.79 | 13.47 | 1.91 | 50.39 | 15.58 | 44.88 | 4.00 | 59.26 | 4:55.85 | 7316 | |
| 7 | Antonio Peñalver | Spain | 11.38 | 6.93 | 12.56 | 2.03 | 51.41 | 15.85 | 40.30 | 4.30 | 48.74 | 4:30.84 | 7229 | |
| 8 | Dezsö Szabó | Hungary | 11.46 | 7.06 | 12.13 | 1.91 | 49.62 | 15.77 | 32.74 | 4.80 | 49.16 | 4:28.51 | 7215 | |
| 9 | Jari Näkki | Finland | 11.35 | 6.61 | 12.49 | 1.94 | 52.41 | 15.38 | 38.82 | 4.50 | 62.12 | 4:48.23 | 7203 | |
| 10 | Róbert Zmelík | Czechoslovakia | 11.05 w (w: 3.7 m/s) | 7.22 | 15.15 | 1.94 | 50.19 | 15.16 (w: 0.4 m/s) | 36.48 | 3.70 | 50.66 | 4:42.66 | 7108 | |
| 11 | Emilio Valle | Cuba | 11.30 | 7.04 | 12.74 | 1.79 | 50.67 | 15.04 | 38.30 | 4.00 | 53.48 | 4:39.16 | 7090 | |
| 12 | Michael Arnold | Austria | 11.40 | 6.87 | 12.68 | 1.97 | 51.65 | 15.16 | 31.96 | 4.20 | 55.00 | 4:45.08 | 7039 | |
| 13 | Tim Foster | Australia | 11.49 | 6.25 | 12.70 | 1.85 | 50.35 | 15.78 | 36.38 | 4.50 | 56.60 | 4:35.82 | 7017 | |
| 14 | Csaba Fábián | Hungary | 11.45 | 7.10 | 11.55 | 1.91 | 50.19 | 15.15 | 35.28 | 3.80 | 49.80 | 4:29.19 | 7007 | |
| 15 | Stylianos Vasilakis | Greece | 11.60 | 6.83 | 13.24 | 1.97 | 51.65 | 16.11 | 36.98 | 4.00 | 48.32 | 4:42.81 | 6871 | |
| 16 | Even Hytten | Norway | 11.49 | 6.69 | 11.67 | 1.91 | 50.19 | 15.88 | 40.30 | 3.40 | 51.22 | 4:30.70 | 6832 | |
| 17 | Cor Troost | Netherlands | 11.18 | 6.33 | 13.26 | 1.85 | 49.71 | 16.66 | 39.86 | 3.60 | 52.84 | 4:37.00 | 6822 | |
| 18 | Barry Walsh | Ireland | 11.70 | 6.49 | 12.90 | 1.97 | 52.08 | 16.14 | 42.30 | 3.80 | 50.40 | 4:47.36 | 6784 | |
| 19 | Michael Jørgensen | Denmark | 11.65 | 6.69 | 11.55 | 1.79 | 50.41 | 16.52 | 36.64 | 4.20 | 57.42 | 4:41.35 | 6772 | |
| 20 | Stanley Verbal | United States | 11.55 | 5.94 | 11.59 | 1.85 | 49.61 | 15.56 | 34.78 | 4.00 | 56.88 | 4:33.79 | 6659 | |
| 21 | Sean Boser | Canada | 11.66 | 6.20 | 12.63 | 1.64 | 53.48 | 17.92 | 34.00 | DNS | 52.98 | 4:51.57 | 5527 | |
| 22 | Dean Torres | Ecuador | 12.48 | 6.22 | 6.78 | 1.68 | 53.14 | 18.07 | 23.28 | 3.90 | 34.66 | 4:29.07 | 5250 | |
| 23 | Hugo Ramos | Paraguay | 11.40 | 6.18 | 8.96 | 1.76 | 54.92 | 18.70 | 30.34 | 2.60 | 34.76 | 5:31.08 | 4973 | |
| | Dimítrios Gournias | Greece | 11.12 | 7.03 | 11.63 | 1.97 | DNS | DNS | DNS | DNS | DNS | DNS | DNF | |
| | Gery Löffler | Switzerland | 11.09 | 6.29 | 11.35 | 1.85 | DNS | DNS | DNS | DNS | DNS | DNS | DNF | |
| | Mike Beyer | East Germany | 11.68 | 6.17 | 10.57 | 1.91 | DNS | DNS | DNS | DNS | DNS | DNS | DNF | |
| | Dionisio Lugo | Venezuela | 10.96 | 6.54 | 12.09 | 1.64 | DNS | DNS | DNS | DNS | DNS | DNS | DNF | |
| | René Schmidheiny | Switzerland | 11.42 | 6.45 | 13.07 | DNS | DNS | DNS | DNS | DNS | DNS | DNS | DNF | |
| | Dietmar Koszewski | West Germany | 11.95 | DNS | DNS | DNS | DNS | DNS | DNS | DNS | DNS | DNS | DNF | |

N.B. In the 100 meters, of the 4 heats, two were run with legal wind & two heats were run with wind above the legal limit of 2 m/s.

== Participation ==
According to an unofficial count, 29 athletes from 21 countries participated in the event.

- Australia (1)
- Austria (1)
- Canada (2)
- Cuba (1)
- Czechoslovakia (1)
- Denmark (1)
- East Germany (2)
- Ecuador (1)
- Finland (2)
- Greece (2)
- Hungary (2)
- Ireland (1)
- Netherlands (1)
- Norway (1)
- Paraguay (1)
- Soviet Union (2)
- Spain (1)
- Switzerland (2)
- United States (1)
- Venezuela (1)
- West Germany (2)
