= 1990 World Junior Championships in Athletics – Men's decathlon =

The men's decathlon event at the 1990 World Junior Championships in Athletics was held in Plovdiv, Bulgaria, at Deveti Septemvri Stadium on 8 and 9 August. Senior implements (106.7 cm (3'6) hurdles, 7257g shot, 2 kg discus) were used.

== Medalists ==
Gold	Eric Kaiser; West Germany
Silver	Jarkko Finni; Finland
Bronze	David Bigham; United Kingdom

== Results ==
=== Final ===
8/9 August

The highest mark recorded in each event is highlighted in yellow

Rank	Name	Nationality	100m	LJ	SP	HJ	400m	110m H	DT	PV	JT	1500m	Points	Notes
1st place, gold medalist(s)	Eric Kaiser	West Germany	11.01 (w: 0.4 m/s)	7.50	12.82	2.03	49.30	14.30 (w: -0.2 m/s)	40.28	4.10	58.12	4:40.66	7762	
2nd place, silver medalist(s)	Jarkko Finni	Finland	10.98 (w: 0.4 m/s)	7.17	14.33	1.85	49.89	14.78 (w: -0.2 m/s)	39.78	4.50	62.06	4:40.92	7698	
3rd place, bronze medalist(s)	David Bigham	United Kingdom	11.16 (w: 0.4 m/s)	7.02	11.90	1.94	48.18	15.07 (w: -0.2 m/s)	34.42	4.60	57.68	4:35.38	7488	
4	Vitaliy Kolpakov	Soviet Union	11.65 (w: 0.7 m/s)	7.02	13.73	2.15	50.73	15.27 (w: -0.5 m/s)	38.12	4.70	47.38	4:35.87	7384	
5	Andreas Hensse	East Germany	12.05 (w: 0.2 m/s)	6.65	14.13	1.88	49.72	15.51 (w: -0.8 m/s)	42.44	4.00	58.86	4:14.53	7323	
6	Dusán Kovács	Hungary	11.34 (w: 0.4 m/s)	7.12	10.73	1.97	48.80	15.03 (w: -0.8 m/s)	35.98	3.80	51.90	4:18.98	7232	
7	Sebastian Chmara	Poland	11.39 (w: 0.2 m/s)	6.85	12.47	2.00	48.56	15.11 (w: -0.2 m/s)	34.62	4.40	42.94	4:32.40	7211	
8	Paul Meier	West Germany	11.20 (w: 0.4 m/s)	6.87	12.49	2.03	49.53	15.78 (w: -0.2 m/s)	37.52	4.20	51.44	4:46.54	7198	
9	Patrik Andersson	Sweden	11.33 (w: 0.2 m/s)	7.00	13.75	1.91	51.49	15.41 (w: -0.2 m/s)	38.32	4.40	52.50	4:53.96	7169	
10	Jim Stevenson	United Kingdom	11.04 (w: 0.2 m/s)	6.99	12.03	1.97	47.97	15.49 (w: -0.2 m/s)	35.24	3.70	45.94	4:26.65	7148	
11	Mario Aníbal	Portugal	11.51 (w: 0.4 m/s)	6.63	12.98	2.03	51.75	15.60 (w: -0.5 m/s)	38.52	4.30	45.58	4:44.90	6998	
12	Sébastien Levicq	France	11.72 (w: 0.2 m/s)	6.54	12.09	1.88	54.11	16.13 (w: -0.2 m/s)	38.72	4.80	56.54	4:56.05	6832	
13	Xavier Brunet	Spain	11.60 (w: 0.4 m/s)	6.66	10.61	2.06	50.25	15.10 (w: -0.2 m/s)	28.64	4.00	49.16	4:44.58	6770	
14	Tomokazu Sugama	Japan	11.31 (w: 0.4 m/s)	6.63	11.07	1.79	50.27	16.58 (w: -0.2 m/s)	35.86	4.30	58.96	4:52.45	6769	
15	Sandro Lange	East Germany	11.63 (w: 0.7 m/s)	6.77	11.51	1.91	50.98	16.08 (w: -0.2 m/s)	31.68	4.40	46.80	4:34.34	6765	
16	Paul Foxson	United States	11.41 (w: 0.4 m/s)	6.74	11.18	1.97	50.07	16.65 (w: -0.8 m/s)	37.66	3.70	51.54	4:45.67	6737	
17	Tomáš Dvořák	Czechoslovakia	11.46 (w: 0.4 m/s)	6.70	11.86	1.88	50.58	15.00 (w: -0.2 m/s)	32.20	3.70	52.36	4:51.93	6710	
18	Zdravko Minkov	Bulgaria	11.31 (w: 0.2 m/s)	6.86	11.21	1.88	50.54	15.13 (w: -0.8 m/s)	33.28	4.00	44.78	4:54.02	6706	
19	Yuriy Baranovskiy	Soviet Union	11.36 (w: 0.4 m/s)	6.74	12.08	1.91	51.90	16.69 (w: -0.8 m/s)	38.56	4.00	51.56	5:06.70	6641	
20	Ruben van Balen	Netherlands	11.33 (w: 0.7 m/s)	6.50	14.71	1.88	50.01	16.40 (w: -0.5 m/s)	40.08	DNS	48.12	4:34.96	6395	
21	Krasimir Petlichki	Bulgaria	11.55 (w: 0.4 m/s)	6.54	11.45	1.94	52.87	15.77 (w: -0.2 m/s)	29.44	3.80	49.76	5:12.89	6305	
22	Thomas Friedli	Switzerland	11.62 (w: 0.7 m/s)	6.60	12.52	2.00	55.92	16.27 (w: -0.5 m/s)	32.12	4.10	50.28	5:31.01	6292	
	Rafael García Arila	Spain	11.64 (w: 0.7 m/s)	6.66	12.98	1.70	50.84	15.42 (w: -0.5 m/s)	38.22	3.90	DNS	DNS	DNF	
	Steve Dunphy	United States	11.31 (w: 0.7 m/s)	6.63	12.92	DNS	DNS	DNS (w: -0.5 m/s)	DNS	DNS	DNS	DNS	DNF	
	Peter Lundqvist	Sweden	10.98 (w: 0.4 m/s)	6.78	DNS	DNS	DNS	DNS (w: -0.8 m/s)	DNS	DNS	DNS	DNS	DNF	

== Participation ==
According to an unofficial count, 25 athletes from 17 countries participated in the event.

- Bulgaria (2)
- Czechoslovakia (1)
- East Germany (2)
- Finland (1)
- France (1)
- Hungary (1)
- Japan (1)
- Netherlands (1)
- Poland (1)
- Portugal (1)
- Soviet Union (2)
- Spain (2)
- Sweden (2)
- Switzerland (1)
- United Kingdom (2)
- United States (2)
- West Germany (2)
