= Athletics at the 1991 Summer Universiade – Men's decathlon =

The men's decathlon event at the 1991 Summer Universiade was held at the Don Valley Stadium in Sheffield on 23 and 24 July 1991.

== Results ==
The highest mark recorded in each event is highlighted in yellow

Rank	Athlete	Nationality	100m	LJ	SP	HJ	400m	110m H	DT	PV	JT	1500m	Points	Notes
1st place, gold medalist(s)	Steve Fritz	United States	11.04	6.99	13.02	2.06	49.80	14.36	45.46	5.10	59.14	4:37.78	8079	
2nd place, silver medalist(s)	Kris Szabadhegy	United States	11.34	7.30	13.18	1.97	49.94	14.51	42.36	4.80	53.08	4:41.66	7719	
3rd place, bronze medalist(s)	Anthony Brannen	Great Britain	11.38	6.90	12.34	2.06	50.37	14.58	39.82	4.60	52.98	4:18.87	7656	
4	Stefan Schmid	Germany	10.90	7.05	12.92	1.91	48.80	14.79	38.72	4.00	65.90	4:36.47	7626	
5	Dusán Kovács	Hungary	11.18	7.31	11.57	1.94	47.33	14.81	38.64	4.00	51.16	4:16.94	7546	
6	Rodney Zuyderwyk	Netherlands	10.91	7.23	12.15	2.00	48.55	14.81	37.86	4.00	59.00	5:08.62	7397	
7	Garth Peet	Canada	11.53	6.84	11.93	1.88	51.51	15.28	37.30	4.30	52.28	4:30.33	7058	
8	René Schmidheiny	Switzerland	11.79	6.68	13.81	1.88	53.16	16.12	44.18	4.30	59.66	4:48.02	7055	
9	Nuno Fernandes	Portugal	11.33	6.42	12.28	2.00	51.03	14.81	31.14	4.80	50.36	5:16.79	6932	
	Duncan Mathieson	Great Britain	11.09	7.22	12.44	2.03	50.09	15.07	40.32	4.10	DNS	–	DNF	
	Norbert Demmel	Germany			15.06								DNF	
	Kim Tae-keun	South Korea											DNF	
	Stefan Schneider	Switzerland											DNF	
