= 1988 World Junior Championships in Athletics – Men's decathlon =

The men's decathlon event at the 1988 World Junior Championships in Athletics was held in Sudbury, Ontario, Canada, at Laurentian University Stadium on 27 and 28 July. Senior implements (106.7 cm (3'6) hurdles, 7257g shot, 2 kg discus) were used.

== Medalists ==
Gold	Michael Kohnle; West Germany
Silver	Robert Změlík; Czechoslovakia
Bronze	Eduard Hämäläinen; Soviet Union

== Results ==
=== Final ===
27/28 July

The highest mark recorded in each event is highlighted in yellow

Rank	Name	Nationality	100m	LJ	SP	HJ	400m	110m H	DT	PV	JT	1500m	Points	Notes
1st place, gold medalist(s)	Michael Kohnle	West Germany	10.78 (w: 0.8 m/s)	6.97	13.25	2.01	48.98	14.60 (w: 0.6 m/s)	36.50	4.50	58.38	4:38.65	7729	
2nd place, silver medalist(s)	Robert Změlík	Czechoslovakia	11.08 (w: -1.3 m/s)	7.29	12.33	2.07	51.08	14.61 (w: 0.6 m/s)	38.98	4.50	56.08	4:37.78	7659	
3rd place, bronze medalist(s)	Eduard Hämäläinen	Soviet Union	11.42	6.99	13.57	2.01	50.21	14.91	39.64	4.70	53.18	4:33.22	7596	
4	Henrik Dagård	Sweden	10.85	7.00	12.08	1.92	47.90	15.20	36.08	4.30	61.40	4:50.03	7453	
5	Norbert Lampe	East Germany	11.06	6.70	12.45	1.86	49.20	15.40	41.12	4.30	53.30	4:25.47	7359	
6	Aleksandr Zhdanovich	Soviet Union	11.04	6.77	12.26	2.01	50.04	15.39	36.22	4.20	50.46	4:34.64	7233	
7	Sándor Munkácsy	Hungary	11.55	6.98	10.84	1.92	50.41	15.35	36.12	4.20	47.82	4:17.96	7063	
8	Mirko Spada	Switzerland	11.65	6.56	14.19	1.83	51.54	15.29	41.92	4.30	49.20	4:44.93	7018	
9	Radek Bartakovic	Czechoslovakia	11.18	6.78	12.74	1.86	48.77	16.56	33.22	4.10	46.52	4:19.30	6982	
10	Philippe Williams	United States	11.47	7.26	10.57	1.89	53.01	16.68	35.28	4.70	56.62	4:42.70	6937	
11	Álvaro Burrel	Spain	11.10	6.42	12.68	1.95	49.12	15.53	40.84	3.60	47.50	4:54.62	6900	
12	Lars-Erik Geisel	West Germany	11.65	6.71	11.62	1.83	51.17	15.78	36.50	4.50	49.68	4:33.26	6883	
13	Marcel Dost	Netherlands	11.41	7.03	11.62	1.92	51.05	15.37	36.00	4.30	41.22	4:50.89	6837	
14	Christian Jacquart	France	11.46	6.45	12.98	1.77	51.36	15.76	40.78	4.20	50.30	4:42.94	6836	
15	Todd Apted	Australia	11.77	6.69	10.99	2.01	52.46	16.34	33.40	4.30	54.94	4:46.84	6729	
16	Thomas Jørgensen	Denmark	12.03	6.10	11.94	1.74	53.45	16.99	36.34	4.70	55.30	4:47.98	6429	
17	Paul Scott	Australia	11.40	6.59	10.41	1.86	49.38	16.47	30.68	3.80	35.58	4:41.88	6292	
	Jón Arnar Magnússon	Iceland	10.93	6.74	11.23	1.92	50.93	16.13	33.48	4.00	DNS	DNS	DNF	
	Luciano Asta	Italy	11.49	6.29	12.40	1.83	52.30	16.59	37.06	4.00	DNS	DNS	DNF	
	Juan Carlos Moeckel	Chile	11.53	7.06	11.28	1.74	53.29	DNS	DNS	DNS	DNS	DNS	DNF	
	Matthew Farmer	United States	11.59	6.81	10.92	1.89	DNS	DNS	DNS	DNS	DNS	DNS	DNF	
	Yiannos Anastasiades	Cyprus	11.99	NM	DNS	DNS	DNS	DNS	DNS	DNS	DNS	DNS	DNF	

== Participation ==
According to an unofficial count, 22 athletes from 17 countries participated in the event.

- Australia (2)
- Chile (1)
- Cyprus (1)
- Czechoslovakia (2)
- Denmark (1)
- East Germany (1)
- France (1)
- Hungary (1)
- Iceland (1)
- Italy (1)
- Netherlands (1)
- Soviet Union (2)
- Spain (1)
- Sweden (1)
- Switzerland (1)
- United States (2)
- West Germany (2)
