= Athletics at the 1990 Commonwealth Games – Men's decathlon =

Men's decathlon at the Commonwealth Games

The men's decathlon event at the 1990 Commonwealth Games was held on 28 and 29 January at the Mount Smart Stadium in Auckland.

== Results ==
The highest mark recorded in each event is highlighted in yellow. The gold medallist, Mike Smith, won five events and placed second in the remaining five -- a remarkable achievement.

Rank	Athlete	Nationality	100m	LJ	SP	HJ	400m	110m H	DT	PV	JT	1500m	Points	Notes
1st place, gold medalist(s)	Mike Smith	Canada	10.85	7.52	14.62	2.05	47.77	14.34	47.56	4.70	64.18	4:24.06	8525	
2nd place, silver medalist(s)	Simon Poelman	New Zealand	10.97	7.62	15.64	2.05	51.13	14.45	44.72	4.60	57.36	4:26.59	8207	
3rd place, bronze medalist(s)	Eugene Gilkes	England	11.01	7.08	14.19	1.87	47.64	14.92w	44.93	4.20	44.86	4:17.96	7705	
4	Alex Kruger	England	11.29	7.20	13.42	2.11	49.90	15.22	39.28	4.20	55.56	4:26.80	7663	
5	Chris Bradshaw	Australia	11.44	7.13	12.14	1.96	49.77	15.30w	37.20	4.50	52.94	4:26.07	7402	
6	Richard Hesketh	Canada	11.32	6.86	12.82	1.96	49.53	15.70w	36.56	4.50	48.14	4:27.74	7274	
7	Gareth Peet	Canada	11.40	6.73	13.04	1.87	51.22	14.97	39.52	4.40	51.52	4:28.45	7245	
8	Duncan Mathieson	Scotland	11.23	7.29	12.31	1.93	49.47	15.20w	36.72	3.60	54.18	4:50.47	7149	
9	Stuart Andrews	Australia	11.20	7.06	12.33	1.87	50.48	15.83	38.32	4.50	53.54	4:53.65	7134	
10	Peter Henry	New Zealand	11.28	7.05	12.95	1.93	51.38	15.29	39.40	4.00	51.26	4:53.30	7071	
11	Terry Lomax	New Zealand	11.50	6.81	11.36	2.05	51.76	15.17	38.62	4.00	47.32	4:45.24	6955	
12	Ferdinand Nongkas	Papua New Guinea	11.20	6.58	10.97	1.78	51.80	16.41w	29.42	2.50	50.10	5:15.06	5869	
13	Homelo Vi	Tonga	11.11	NM	11.36	1.90	50.60	15.07w	34.58	3.60	43.58	5:01.05	5858	
	Mark Bishop	England	11.25	6.72	11.31	1.87	49.00	15.23	35.34	DNS	–	–	DNF	
	Dean Smith	Australia	10.96	7.48	13.72	1.84	DNS	–	–	–	–	–	DNF	
