= Severin Moser =

Swiss decathlete

Personal information
- Nationality: Swiss
- Born: 23 October 1962 (age 63)

Sport
- Sport: Athletics
- Event: Decathlon

Severin Moser (born 23 October 1962) is a former Swiss athlete. He competed in the men's decathlon at the 1988 Summer Olympics. An economist, he had a career as an insurance manager with various insurers. Since 2023, he has been Chairman of the Swiss Employers' Association and a member of the Board of Directors of Swiss Life.

Severin Moser is married to former heptathlete Monika Moser, has two grown-up daughters and lives in Andelfingen. He is the father of pole vaulter Angelica Moser, his older daughter Jasmine Moser was also a pole vaulter in her youth.
