= Dusán Kovács =

Hungarian hurdler

Personal information
- Born: 31 July 1971 (age 55) Balassagyarmat, Hungary
- Education: Semmelweis University; Corvinus University of Budapest
- Height: 1.84 m (6 ft 0 in)
- Weight: 80 kg (176 lb)

Sport
- Sport: Track and field
- Event: 400 metres hurdles
- Club: Vitalitis Sportegyesület
Medal record
Representing Hungary
Summer Universiade
| Bronze medal – third place | 1993 Buffalo | 400 m |
| Bronze medal – third place | 1993 Buffalo | 400 m hurdles |

Dusán Kovács (born 31 July 1971) is a retired Hungarian athlete who specialised in the 400 metres hurdles. He represented his country at the 1996 Summer Olympics, as well as three consecutive World Championships starting in 1993. In addition he won two bronze medals at the 1993 Summer Universiade.

His personal best in the event is 48.45 seconds set at the 1997 World Championships in Athens where he narrowly missed the final. This is the standing national record. He is now an athletics commentator for Hungarian Eurosport.

== Competition record ==
| Year | Competition | Venue | Position | Event | Notes |
Representing Hungary
| 1989 | European Junior Championships | Varaždin, Yugoslavia | 9th | Decathlon | 7163 pts |
| 1990 | World Junior Championships | Plovdiv, Bulgaria | 6th | Decathlon | 7232 pts |
| 1991 | Universiade | Sheffield, United Kingdom | 5th | Decathlon | 7546 pts |
| 1993 | Universiade | Buffalo, United States | 3rd | 400 m hurdles | 50.12 |
| 1993 | Universiade | Buffalo, United States | 3rd | 4x400 m relay | 3:04.27 |
| 1993 | World Championships | Stuttgart, Germany | 23rd (h) | 400 m hurdles | 49.96 |
| 1994 | European Championships | Helsinki, Finland | 13th (sf) | 400 m hurdles | 50.01 |
| 1995 | World Championships | Gothenburg, Sweden | 12th (sf) | 400 m hurdles | 49.57 |
| 1995 | Universiade | Fukuoka, Japan | 5th | 400 m hurdles | 49.35 |
| 1995 | Universiade | Fukuoka, Japan | 11th (h) | 4x400 m relay | 3:09.59 |
| 1996 | European Indoor Championships | Stockholm, Sweden | – | 400 m | DQ |
| 1996 | Olympic Games | Atlanta, United States | 11th (sf) | 400 m hurdles | 48.57 |
| 1997 | World Indoor Championships | Paris, France | 14th (sf) | 400 m | 47.23 |
| 1997 | World Championships | Athens, Greece | 7th (sf) | 400 m hurdles | 48.45 |
| 1997 | Universiade | Catania, Italy | 8th (sf) | 400 m hurdles | 49.40 |
