= 1991 Hypo-Meeting =

The 17th edition of the annual Hypo-Meeting took place on 15 and 16 June 1991 in Götzis, Austria. The track and field competition featured a men's decathlon and a women's heptathlon. The meeting was the most major combined events competition prior to the 1991 IAAF World Championships in Tokyo, Japan.

== Men's Decathlon ==
=== Schedule ===
15 June
1. 100 m
2. Long Jump
3. Shot Put
4. High Jump
5. 400 m

16 June
6. 110 m hurdles
7. Discus Throw
8. Pole Vault
9. Javelin Throw
10. 1,500 m

=== Records ===
World Record	Daley Thompson (GBR)	8847	9 August 1984	Los Angeles, United States
Event Record	Daley Thompson (GBR)	8730	23 May 1982	Götzis, Austria

=== Results ===
Rank	Athlete	Decathlon										Points
Rank	Athlete	1	2	3	4	5	6	7	8	9	10	Points
1	Michael Smith (CAN)	10,73	7.48	15.19	2.08	47,18	14,48	47.34	4.60	59.22	4:36,42	8427
2	Robert Změlík (TCH)	10,78	7.71	13.17	2.11	48,20	13,82	38.66	5.00	57.20	4:33,03	8346
3	Mikhail Medved (UKR)	11,15	7.31	16.29	2.08	50,43	14,68	51.02	4.90	60.24	4:50,01	8278
4	Christian Schenk (GER)	11,17	7.32	15.16	2.17	49,09	14,78	45.38	4.70	57.60	4:33,65	8227
5	Thorsten Dauth (GER)	10,63	7.14	15.76	2.08	48,06	14,47	43.68	4.20	60.80	4:42,26	8156
6	Michael Kohnle (GER)	10,71	7.44	14.96	2.05	48,31	14,50	40.42	4.70	59.18	5:00,64	8062
7	Norbert Demmel (GER)	11,13	6.82	15.48	1.96	49,45	14,90	49.98	4.60	54.44	4:34,33	7922
8	Henrik Dagård (SWE)	10,75	7.23	13.37	1.96	47,14	14,77	40.64	4.60	59.80	4:48,87	7900
9	Stefan Schmid (GER)	11,01	7.16	13.36	1.96	48,76	14,45	34.40	4.50	65.52	4:38,49	7779
10	Sándor Munkácsi (HUN)	11,13	7.02	12.62	1.99	48,14	14,46	39.46	4.60	52.10	4:29,15	7720
11	Aleksandr Golovin (URS)	10,57	6.60	14.78	1.93	48,05	14,79	46.82	4.40	44.20	4:42,55	7679
12	Eric Kaiser (GER)	10,96	7.53	12.67	1.96	49,40	13,88	38.56	4.30	52.32	4:58,74	7585
13	Alper Kasapoğlu (TUR)	10.95	7.39	13.35	1.93	50,79	14,47	40.90	4.60	44.06	4:45,82	7521
14	Martin Krenn (AUT)	11,49	6.69	14.00	1.93	50,28	15,80	40.98	4.60	61.06	4:33,39	7472
15	Igor Maryin (RUS)	11,08	6.99	13.99	1.99	51,70	15,14	45.56	5.00	49.52	5:25,45	7438
16	Eduard Hämäläinen (BLR)	10,98	7.43	14.82	2.05	48,23	14,45	40.60	4.90	51.44	NM	7394
17	Peng Huan-shu (TPE)	10,99	6.96	12.41	1.96	49,96	15,03	40.50	4.00	53.84	4:54,39	7257
18	Lars Warming (DEN)	11,38	6.71	13.47	1.87	49,99	15,06	39.82	4.20	52.12	4:32,92	7244
19	Dietmar Juriga (AUT)	11,17	6.56	13,34	1.96	49,48	14,84	41.06	4.00	48.86	4:55,32	7159
20	Gerhard Röser (AUT)	11,22	6.73	13,21	1.81	51,50	15,81	37.52	4.20	48.14	4:51,33	6838
—	Harald Eder (AUT)	11,11	6.19	13,32	1.84	51,86	DNF	NM	3.80	DNS	—	DNF
—	Gernot Kellermayr (AUT)	10,57	7.20	NM	DNS	—	—	—	—	—	—	DNF
—	Robert Pracher (AUT)	11,53	DNS	—	—	—	—	—	—	—	—	DNF

== Women's Heptathlon ==
=== Schedule ===
15 June
1. 100 m hurdles
2. High Jump
3. Shot Put
4. 200 m

16 June
5. Long Jump
6. Javelin Throw
7. 800 m

=== Records ===
World Record	Jackie Joyner-Kersee (USA)	7291	24 September 1988	Seoul, South Korea
Event Record	Jackie Joyner-Kersee (USA)	6841	25 May 1986	Götzis, Austria

== See also ==
- 1991 World Championships in Athletics – Men's decathlon
- 1991 World Championships in Athletics – Women's heptathlon
