= Peter Winter (athlete) =

Australian decathlete (born 1971)

Personal information
- Nationality: Australian
- Born: 17 January 1971 (age 55)

Sport
- Sport: Track and field
- Event: Decathlon
Medal record
Men's athletics
Representing Australia
Commonwealth Games
Silver medal – second place	1994 Victoria BC	Men's decathlon

Peter John Winter (born 17 January 1971 in Melbourne, Victoria) is a retired male decathlete from Australia. He first represented Australia at the World Junior Championships in 1990. He further represented at the World Student Games in 1993. He was a Commonwealth Games silver medallist in 1994 in Victoria, Canada and first broke the Australian Record with 8074 points at that competition. He broke this record again whilst qualifying for the 1996 Summer Olympics with 8084 points after taking a year off due to an operation for a knee problem. He then competed at the 1996 Olympics in the decathlon, only to record 3 no jumps in the long jump.

Attended Melbourne High School 1985–1988. Attended Victoria University 1990-1992 completing a Bachelor of Applied Science with a triple major in Physical Education, Sports Psychology and Sports Marketing. He then declined entry into a PhD program for Sports Psychology preferring instead to enter a combined LLB/BA program at Monash University. He decided not to finish this program in preference for beginning a career as a track and field coach.

Winter ran his own business in Melbourne as a track and field consultant from 2000 to 2007 where one of his clients, St Kevin's College, became the most successful Boys Secondary School for the sport of Athletics in the country. He also coached national underage champions for the Decathlon in 2004, 2006 and 2007 as well as national underage champions in the 110h and 800m and 400m athletes.

Winter filled the position of Head Coach of Athletics at NorthSport Academy, based at the Millennium Institute in Auckland, New Zealand.

He was coached by former Ukrainian coach Efim Shuravetsky before self coaching from 1994 to 1996. He now has a mentoree relationship with Efim.
