= Athletics at the 1994 Commonwealth Games – Men's decathlon =

Men's decathlon at the Commonwealth Games

The men's decathlon event at the 1994 Commonwealth Games was held at the Centennial Stadium in Victoria, British Columbia on 23 and 24 August.

== Results ==
The highest mark recorded in each event is highlighted in yellow

Rank	Athlete	Nationality	100m	LJ	SP	HJ	400m	110m H	DT	PV	JT	1500m	Points	Notes
1st place, gold medalist(s)	Mike Smith	Canada	11.00	6.94	16.22	1.98	48.85	14.82	48.62	5.10	67.98	4:47.38	8326	
2nd place, silver medalist(s)	Peter Winter	Australia	10.79	7.65	13.68	1.95	47.95	14.47	41.08	4.90	60.40	4:54.94	8074	
3rd place, bronze medalist(s)	Simon Shirley	England	10.89	7.11	14.16	2.04	48.90	14.87	38.38	4.60	63.80	4:32.34	7980	
4	Dean Barton-Smith	Australia	10.87	7.49	14.84	1.95	51.20	15.71	45.96	4.70	61.48	4:40.93	7926	
5	Doug Pirini	New Zealand	10.81	7.48	13.04	1.92	47.99	15.16	43.06	4.70	51.80	4:36.16	7840	
6	Rafer Joseph	England	11.06	6.80	13.04	1.95	50.50	15.08	48.30	4.70	54.64	4:40.48	7663	
7	Alex Kruger	England	11.28	7.18	14.07	2.10	50.14	15.10	41.58	4.50	58.08	5:02.80	7640	
8	Jamie Quarry	Scotland	10.86	6.89	13.44	1.95	49.76	14.36	41.08	4.30	51.54	4:33.24	7610	
9	Brendan Tennant	Australia	11.08	7.04	13.77	1.92	50.06	15.71	39.30	4.40	63.64	4:39.06	7549	
10	Georgios Andreou	Cyprus	11.11	7.19	13.11	2.04	52.56	16.94	42.34	4.30	51.36	5:07.54	7080	
11	Richard Hesketh	Canada	11.32	6.89	13.35	1.89	51.25	16.15	37.08	4.30	49.38	4:42.33	6999	
12	Victor Houston	Barbados	10.76	7.52	11.67	2.07	49.01	14.64	31.34	NM	55.44	4:40.97	6898	
13	Gregory Turner	Canada	11.11	6.77	12.70		51.20	15.96	12.12	4.20	54.76	5:14.82	6360	
14	Sekona Vi	Tonga	11.33	5.94	12.13		51.33	15.86	39.00	3.70	46.92	5:12 96	6266	
	Joel Wade	Belize	11.55	6.91	10.30		DNS	–	–	–	–	–	DNF	
	Simon Poelman	New Zealand	11.15	NM	DNS	–	–	–	–	–	–	–	DNF	
