= Pavlo Tarnovetskyy =

Soviet decathlete

Pavlo Heorhiyovych Tarnovetskyy (Ukrainian: Павло Георгійович Тарновецький (born 21 February 1961) is a retired decathlete who represented the Soviet Union during his active career. He was born in Storozhynets, Ukrainian SSR.

He won the bronze medal at the 1987 World Championships with a score of 8375 points. This was enough to place third on the world top list that season.

== Achievements ==
Year	Tournament	Venue	Result	Event
1987	World Championships	Rome, Italy	3rd	Decathlon
1987	Décastar	Talence, France	1st	Decathlon
1988	Hypo-Meeting	Götzis, Austria	6th	Decathlon
1988	Summer Olympics	Seoul, South Korea	10th	Decathlon
