= Lee Gwang-ik =

South Korean decathlete

Personal information
- Nationality: South Korean
- Born: 27 May 1969 (age 57)

Sport
- Sport: Athletics
- Event: Decathlon

Lee Gwang-ik (born 27 May 1969) is a South Korean athlete. He competed in the men's decathlon at the 1988 Summer Olympics.
