= 1993 Hypo-Meeting =

The 19th edition of the annual Hypo-Meeting took place on 29 and 30 May 1993 in Götzis, Austria. The track and field competition featured a decathlon (men) and a heptathlon (women) event.

== Men's Decathlon ==
=== Schedule ===
29 May
1. 100 m
2. Long Jump
3. Shot Put
4. High Jump
5. 400 m

30 May
6. 110 m hurdles
7. Discus Throw
8. Pole Vault
9. Javelin Throw
10. 1,500 m

=== Records ===
World Record	Dan O'Brien (USA)	8891	5 September 1992	Talence, France
Event Record	Daley Thompson (GBR)	8730	23 May 1982	Götzis, Austria

=== Results ===
Rank	Athlete	Decathlon										Points
Rank	Athlete	1	2	3	4	5	6	7	8	9	10	Points
1	Eduard Hämäläinen (BLR)	10,74	7.67	15.99	2.08	47,41	13,65	45.20	4.80	59.98	4.42,82	8604
2	Paul Meier (GER)	10,53	7.86	15.41	2.08	47,36	14,39	44.18	4.50	60.52	4.44,42	8460
3	Michael Smith (CAN)	10,87	7.76	15.30	2.05	48,25	14,72	46.80	4.60	66.44	4.52,38	8362
4	Gernot Kellermayr (AUT)	10,47	7.66	14.83	1.96	47,56	14,12	42.50	5.00	58.24	4.54,78	8320
5	Robert Změlík (CZE)	10,75	7.64	14.00	1.99	48,94	13,98	42.48	4.90	58.72	4.49,17	8188
6	Lev Lobodin (UKR)	10,82	7.43	14.74	1.99	48,63	14,05	43.04	4.90	54.32	4.42,85	8156
7	Mikhail Medved (UKR)	11,16	7.14	16.21	2.02	49,94	14,38	50.82	4.90	55.66	4.52,33	8146
8	Christian Plaziat (FRA)	10,85	7.30	14.35	2.08	48,67	14,18	44.72	4.60	52.80	4.38,54	8107
9	Michael Kohnle (GER)	11,04	7.53	14.74	1.99	50,19	14,35	42.10	5.10	59.18	5.04,60	8006
10	Henrik Dagård (SWE)	10,83	7.09	14.25	1.84	48,08	14,69	43.34	4.80	68.08	4.54,52	7965
11	Petri Keskitalo (FIN)	11,12	7.47	14.97	1.93	51,15	14,71	44.18	4.90	68.72	5.08,15	7950
12	Thorsten Dauth (GER)	10,93	7.46	15.89	2.02	49,31	14,78	43.36	4.40	49.46	4.52,04	7841
13	William Motti (FRA)	11,56	7.00	15.02	2.11	51,08	15,30	47.76	4.80	64.54	5.07,09	7829
14	Christian Mandrou (FRA)	11,16	7.27	12.95	1.96	48,59	14,76	39.26	4.30	62.32	4.33,08	7744
15	Viktor Radchenko (UKR)	11,77	6.99	14.81	1.99	51,93	14,72	42.98	5.00	63.50	4.57,78	7691
16	Erwin Reiterer (AUT)	11,13	7.35	15.15	2.08	52,63	14,52	42.12	4.20	65.10	5.18,37	7667
17	Sébastien Levicq (FRA)	11,34	6.84	14.05	1.87	51,35	14,82	37.36	5.00	62.96	4.38,72	7595
18	Dirk-Achim Pajonk (GER)	10,90	7.13	13.77	1.93	48,68	14,90	37.80	4.40	50.72	4.33,15	7594
19	Mirko Spada (SUI)	11,47	6.71	14.35	1.93	51,02	14,46	42.06	4.50	56.28	4.40,21	7507
20	Peter Soldos (CZE)	11,12	7.16	13.63	2.02	50,07	15,85	42.42	4.40	49.62	5.02,48	7349
21	Norbert Lampe (GER)	10,99	7.00	12.69	1.90	50,67	15,31	40.88	4.30	55.98	4.50,29	7314
22	Gerhard Röser (AUT)	11,18	7.09	13.38	1.84	49,70	15,37	41.32	4.00	55.68	4.49,68	7242
23	Leonhard Hudec (AUT)	10,96	7.12	11.50	1.96	50,17	14,83	27.52	4.40	58.18	4.55,01	7178
24	Ramil Ganiyev (UZB)	11,07	7.39	14.10	2.02	50,72	14,71	42.26	NM	50.66	4.52,97	6886

== Women's Heptathlon ==
=== Schedule ===
29 May
1. 100 m hurdles
2. High Jump
3. Shot Put
4. 200 m

30 May
5. Long Jump
6. Javelin Throw
7. 800 m

=== Records ===
World Record	Jackie Joyner-Kersee (USA)	7291	24 September 1988	Seoul, South Korea
Event Record	Sabine Braun (GER)	6985	31 May 1992	Götzis, Austria

== See also ==
- 1993 World Championships in Athletics – Men's decathlon
- 1993 World Championships in Athletics – Women's heptathlon
