= Athletics at the 1988 Summer Olympics – Men's decathlon =

Men's decathlon at the Games of the XXIV Olympiad
- Pictogram of athletics
- Venues: Olympic Stadium
- Dates: September 28–29
- Competitors: 39 from 26 nations
- Winning result: 8488

Medalists
1st place, gold medalist(s)		Christian Schenk; East Germany
2nd place, silver medalist(s)		Torsten Voss; East Germany
3rd place, bronze medalist(s)		Dave Steen; Canada

These are the official results of the Men's Decathlon competition at the 1988 Summer Olympics in Seoul, South Korea. There were a total number of 39 participating athletes, with five competitors who didn't finish the competition.

== Medalists ==
Gold	Christian Schenk; East Germany
Silver	Torsten Voss; East Germany
Bronze	Dave Steen; Canada

== Schedule ==
September 28, 1988
1. 100 m
2. Long Jump
3. Shot Put
4. High Jump
5. 400 m

September 29, 1988
6. 110 m hurdles
7. Discus Throw
8. Pole Vault
9. Javelin Throw
10. 1,500 m

== Records ==
These were the standing world and Olympic records (in points) prior to the 1988 Summer Olympics.

World Record	8798(*)	8832(**)	(West Germany) Jürgen Hingsen	Mannheim (FRG)	June 9, 1984
World Record	8797(*)	8847(**)	(United Kingdom) Daley Thompson	Los Angeles (USA)	August 9, 1984
Olympic Record	8797(*)	8847(**)	(United Kingdom) Daley Thompson	Los Angeles (USA)	August 9, 1984

(*) Original score according to the 1962/1977 tables.

(**) Score according to the 1985 tables.

Thompson's mark was not a world record in 1984, but when the 1985 tables came into use, his mark became the record. They were both given credit for the world record.

== Results ==
The highest mark recorded in each event is highlighted in yellow. These marks were split between six competitors with the gold medallist claiming the high jump mark.

Neither the silver nor bronze medallists claimed any of these marks yet the competitor who placed 17th claimed three of them.

Rank	Athlete	Nationality	100m	LJ	SP	HJ	400m	110m H	DT	PV	JT	1500m	Points	Notes
1st place, gold medalist(s)	Christian Schenk	East Germany	11.25	7.43	15.48	2.27	48.90	15.13	49.28	4.70	61.32	4:28.95	8488	
2nd place, silver medalist(s)	Torsten Voss	East Germany	10.87	7.45	14.97	1.97	47.71	14.46	44.36	5.10	61.76	4:33.02	8399	
3rd place, bronze medalist(s)	Dave Steen	Canada	11.18	7.44	14.20	1.97	48.29	14.81	43.66	5.20	64.16	4:23.20	8328	
4	Daley Thompson	Great Britain	10.62	7.38	15.02	2.03	49.06	14.72	44.80	4.90	64.04	4:45.11	8306	
5	Christian Plaziat	France	10.83	7.62	13.58	2.12	48.34	14.18	43.06	4.90	52.18	4:34.07	8272	
6	Alain Blondel	France	11.02	7.43	12.92	1.97	47.44	14.40	41.20	5.20	57.46	4:16.64	8268	
7	Tim Bright	United States	11.18	7.05	14.12	2.06	49.34	14.39	41.68	5.70	61.60	4:51.20	8216	
8	Robert de Wit	Netherlands	11.05	6.95	15.34	2.00	48.21	14.36	41.32	4.80	63.00	4:25.86	8189	
9	Dave Johnson	United States	11.15	7.12	14.52	2.03	49.15	14.66	42.36	4.90	66.46	4:29.62	8180	
10	Pavel Tarnavetskiy	Soviet Union	11.23	7.28	15.25	1.97	48.60	14.76	48.02	5.20	59.48	4:52.24	8167	
11	Petri Keskitalo	Finland	10.94	7.56	15.34	1.97	49.94	14.25	41.86	4.80	66.64	4:55.89	8143	
12	Beat Gähwiler	Switzerland	11.18	7.34	14.48	1.94	49.02	15.11	42.46	4.70	65.84	4:16.74	8114	
13	Dezső Szabó	Hungary	11.02	7.29	12.92	2.06	48.23	14.96	39.54	5.00	56.80	4:17.85	8093	
14	Mike Smith	Canada	10.99	7.37	13.61	1.97	47.83	14.70	43.88	4.30	66.54	4:28.97	8083	
15	Simon Shirley	Australia	11.03	7.45	14.20	1.97	48.84	15.44	41.68	4.70	64.00	4:27.48	8036	
16	Simon Poelman	New Zealand	11.09	7.08	14.51	2.03	49.89	14.78	43.20	4.90	57.18	4:28.54	8021	
17	Mikael Olander	Sweden	11.46	6.75	16.07	2.00	51.28	16.06	50.66	4.80	72.80	5:02.42	7869	
18	Uwe Freimuth	East Germany	11.57	7.00	15.60	1.94	49.84	15.04	46.66	4.90	60.20	4:46.04	7860	
19	Lars Warming	Denmark	11.07	7.04	13.41	1.94	47.97	14.49	40.38	4.80	51.50	4:22.41	7859	
20	Roman Hrabaň	Czechoslovakia	10.89	7.07	15.84	1.79	49.68	14.94	45.32	4.90	60.48	5:06.68	7781	
21	Georg Werthner	Austria	11.52	7.36	13.93	1.94	49.99	15.64	38.82	4.60	67.04	4:26.42	7753	
22	Christian Gugler	Switzerland	11.49	7.02	13.80	2.03	50.60	15.22	39.08	4.70	60.92	4:21.93	7745	
23	Antonio Peñalver	Spain	11.38	7.08	14.31	2.00	50.24	14.97	46.34	4.40	55.68	4:32.68	7743	
24	Alex Kruger	Great Britain	11.30	6.97	13.23	2.15	49.98	15.38	38.72	4.60	54.34	4:37.84	7623	
25	Lee Fu-an	Chinese Taipei	11.00	7.23	13.15	2.03	49.73	14.96	38.06	4.50	52.82	4:45.57	7579	
26	Santiago Mellado	El Salvador	11.33	6.83	11.63	2.06	48.37	15.39	37.52	4.60	55.42	4:30.07	7517	NR
27	Severin Moser	Switzerland	11.10	6.98	12.69	1.85	48.63	15.13	38.04	4.70	49.52	4:21.90	7502	
28	Věroslav Valenta	Czechoslovakia	11.51	7.01	14.17	1.94	51.16	15.18	45.84	4.60	56.28	5:03.17	7442	
29	Carlos O'Connell	Ireland	11.26	6.90	12.41	1.88	48.24	15.61	38.02	4.40	52.68	4:32.06	7310	
30	Greg Richards	Great Britain	11.50	7.09	12.94	1.82	49.27	15.56	42.32	4.50	53.50	4:53.85	7237	
31	Gong Guohua	China	11.43	6.22	13.98	1.91	51.25	15.88	46.18	4.60	57.84	4:54.99	7231	
32	Albert Miller	Fiji	11.47	6.43	12.33	1.94	50.30	15.00	38.72	4.00	57.26	4:53.72	7231	
33	Lee Gwang-ik	South Korea	11.57	7.19	10.27	1.91	50.71	16.20	34.36	4.10	54.94	4:29.98	7231	
34	Dambar Kunwar	Nepal	12.12	5.83	9.71	1.71	52.32	17.05	27.10	2.80	39.10	4:41.24	5339	
	Valter Külvet	Soviet Union	11.31	7.14	15.29	2.00	50.62	DNS	–	–	–	–	DNF	
	Gary Kinder	United States	11.31	7.00	14.89	1.97	51.79	DNS	–	–	–	–	DNF	
	Fidel Solórzano	Ecuador	11.01	6.79	11.76	1.88	DNS	–	–	–	–	–	DNF	
	Aleksandr Apaychev	Soviet Union	DNF	–	–	–	–	–	–	–	–	–	DNF	
	Jürgen Hingsen	West Germany	DQ	–	–	–	–	–	–	–	–	–	DNF	

== See also ==
- 1986 Men's European Championships Decathlon
- 1987 Men's World Championship Decathlon
- 1988 Hypo-Meeting
- 1990 Men's European Championships Decathlon
