= David Bigham =

British decathlete (born 1971)

Personal information
- Nationality: British (English)
- Born: 4 July 1971 (age 54) Walthamstow, England
- Height: 175 cm (5 ft 9 in)
- Weight: 72 kg (159 lb)

Sport
- Sport: Athletics
- Event: Decathlon
- Club: Woodford Green AC

David Bryce Bigham (born 4 July 1971) is a former athlete from England who competed at the 1992 Summer Olympics.

== Biography ==
At the 1992 Olympic Games in Barcelona, he represented Great Britain in the men's decathlon event.

Bigham finished second behind Barry Thomas in the decathlon event at the 1994 AAA Championships held in Horsham.
