= Věroslav Valenta =

Czech decathlete

Personal information
- Nationality: Czech
- Born: 25 March 1965 (age 61) Litomyšl, Czechoslovakia

Sport
- Sport: Athletics
- Event: Decathlon

Věroslav Valenta (born 25 March 1965) is a Czech athlete. He competed in the men's decathlon at the 1988 Summer Olympics.
