= Gary Kinder =

American decathlete

Gary Kinder (born October 25, 1962) is a U.S. Olympian who participated in the decathlon at the 1988 Olympics in Seoul. Kinder qualified for the team by finishing first in the 1988 United States Olympic trials in a PR 8293pts. Kinder finished 12th in the 1987 World Championships of track and field with 8030 points, beating teammate Rob Muzzio by 13 points.

== Career ==
Kinder attended the University of Mississippi and was coached by head coach Joe Walker. Kinder still holds the university records in the decathlon (7565 pts.) and javelin (old style-224'3"). He transferred to the University of New Mexico and finished 2nd at the 1985 NCAA championships in the decathlon with 7965 points, still the record for the university.

Kinder first appeared on the U.S. list in 1985 with a #6 ranking, and reached #2 in 1988. He was ranked in the top 10 U.S. decathletes continuously from 1985 through 1990. His finishes at the U.S. championships were:

- 1985: 6th 7654 (w)
- 1986: 3rd 7857
- 1987: 3rd 8053 berth in 1987 World Championships.
- 1988: 1st 8293 Olympic team member
- 1989: 3rd 8155 (w)

1997: 12th 7695

Kinder is currently #96 on the world all-time list in decathlon with his personal best of 8293.

In June 1991, Kinder was suspended for two years over a doping violation by the governing body of USA Track and Field. However, the ruling was immediately overturned by an arbitration panel of USA Track and Field when flaws in the testing protocol were discovered in this case. Kinder went on to compete in the 1992 Olympic Trials as well as two more United States Decathlon Championships.

He coached high school track and field at Brentwood, Tennessee, and founded a company, KinderSport. He also served coaching stints at the University of New Mexico and University of Virginia.
