= Antonio Peñalver =

Spanish decathlete

Antonio Peñalver Asensio (born 1 December 1968 in Alhama de Murcia) is a retired Spanish decathlete. He won a Silver in the 1992 Olympics by beating Dave Johnson by 103 points. He was also part of Larios Club, today named A.A.Moratalaz.

== Achievements ==
Year	Competition	Venue	Position	Event	Notes
Representing Spain
1986	World Junior Championships	Athens, Greece	7th	Decathlon	7229 pts
1988	Olympic Games	Seoul, South Korea	23rd	Decathlon	7743 pts
1990	European Championships	Split, Yugoslavia	6th	Decathlon	8214 pts
1990	Ibero-American Championships	Manaus, Brazil	1st	Decathlon	7824 pts
1991	World Championships	Tokyo, Japan	8th	Decathlon	8200 pts
1992	European Indoor Championships	Genoa, Italy	3rd	Heptathlon	6062 pts
1992	Olympic Games	Barcelona, Spain	2nd	Decathlon	8412 pts
1994	European Championships	Helsinki, Finland	—	Decathlon	DNF
1995	World Indoor Championships	Barcelona, Spain	6th	Heptathlon	5939 pts
1995	World Championships	Gothenburg, Sweden	—	Decathlon	DNF
1996	Olympic Games	Atlanta, United States	9th	Decathlon	8307 pts
