= Andrei Nazarov (athlete) =

Estonian decathlete

Andrei Nazarov (born 9 January 1965) is a retired decathlete, who competed for the Soviet Union and later for his native country Estonia. He was born in Tallinn. His personal best in the men's decathlon was 8322 points, achieved in 1987 (Sochi).

== Achievements ==
Year	Competition	Venue	Position	Result
Representing the Soviet Union
1990	European Championships	Split, Yugoslavia	8th	8072 pts
Representing Estonia
1992	Olympic Games	Barcelona, Spain	14th	8052 pts
1994	European Championships	Helsinki, Finland	11th	7894 pts
1995	World Championships	Gothenburg, Sweden	10th	8088 pts
1996	Olympic Games	Atlanta, United States	—	DNF

== Coaching ==
After retiring as a decathlete, Nazarov started coaching. He has coached decathlete Erki Nool, Pascal Behrenbruch, Janek Õiglane and heptathlete Larisa Netšeporuk, Remigija Nazaroviene, Laura Ikauniece, long jumper and sprinter Ksenija Balta, long jumper Tõnis Sahk, triple jumper Lauri Leis, and decathlete Indrek Turi.
