= Paul Meier (athlete) =

German decathlete

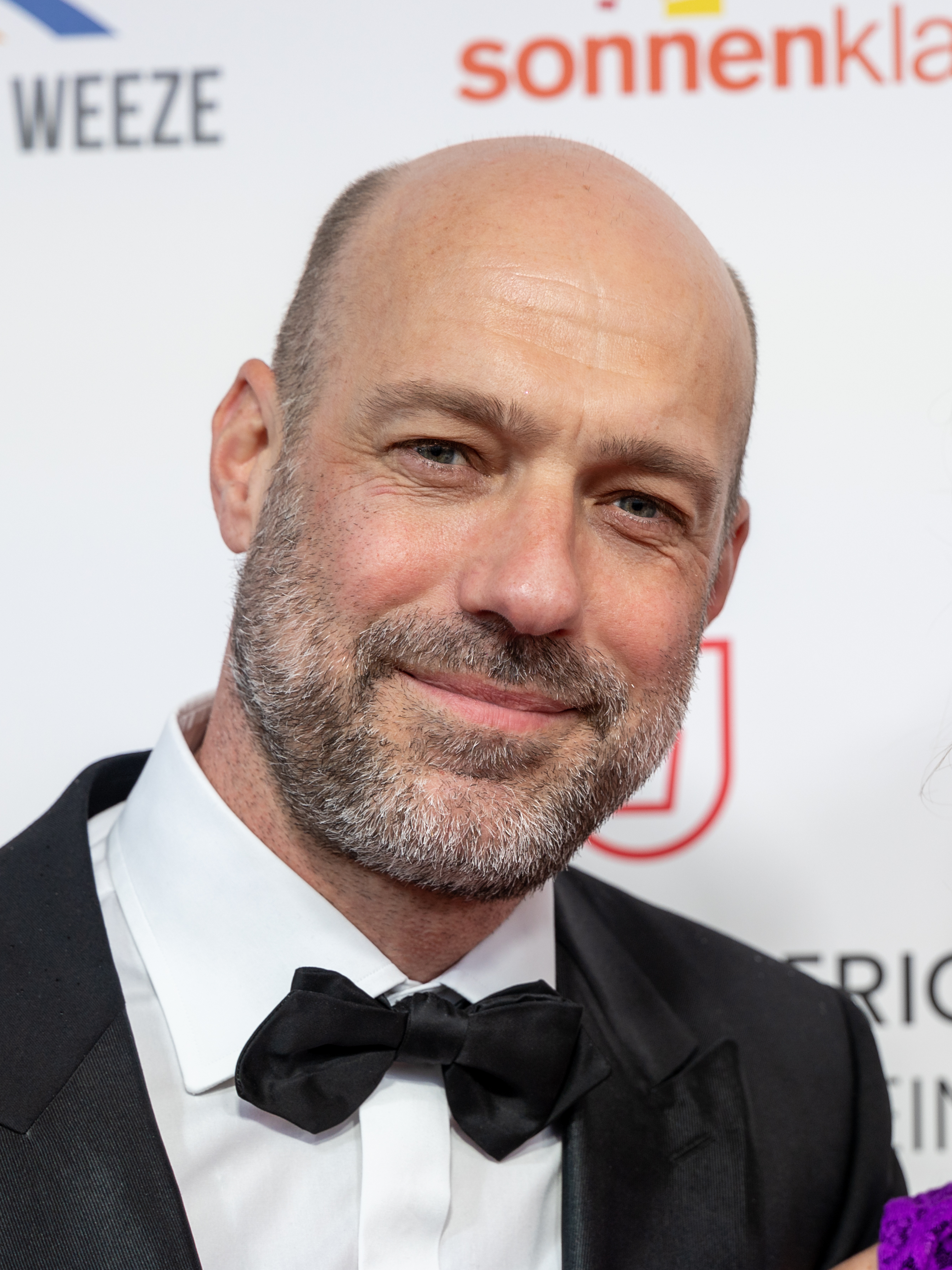
Paul Meier (2023)

Paul Meier (born 27 July 1971 in Velbert) is former German decathlete who won a bronze medal at the 1993 World Championships in Athletics in Stuttgart where he set a personal best of 8548 points. A year earlier he had finished in sixth place at the 1992 Summer Olympics.

At the 1996 European Cup for Decathlon in Lage, Meier injured himself in the long jump and was unable to participate in the 1996 Summer Olympics in Atlanta. His personal best of 8548 points ranks him seventh among German decathletes, behind Jürgen Hingsen, Uwe Freimuth, Siegfried Wentz, Frank Busemann, Torsten Voss and Guido Kratschmer.

On 30 April 2004 he married high jumper Heike Henkel. Their daughter Marlene Meier is also an athlete.

== Achievements ==
Year	Competition	Venue	Position	Event	Notes
Representing West Germany
1990	World Junior Championships	Plovdiv, Bulgaria	8th	Decathlon	7198 pts
Representing Germany
1992	Hypo-Meeting	Götzis, Austria	5th	Decathlon	8153 pts
1992	Olympic Games	Barcelona, Spain	6th	Decathlon	8192 pts
1993	Hypo-Meeting	Götzis, Austria	2nd	Decathlon	8460 pts
1993	World Championships	Stuttgart, Germany	3rd	Decathlon	8548 pts
1995	Hypo-Meeting	Götzis, Austria	8th	Decathlon	8149 pts
1995	World Championships	Gothenburg, Sweden	—	Decathlon	DNF
