= Petri Keskitalo =

Finnish decathlete (born 1967)

Petri Juhani Keskitalo (born March 10, 1967, in Raahe, Northern Ostrobothnia) is a retired male decathlete from Finland. He was nicknamed "Pete" and "Elmo".

His best performance was fifth place (8318 points) at the 1991 World Championships in Athletics in Tokyo. Result was Finnish record at that time. He finished in eleventh place (8143 points) at the 1988 Summer Olympics in Seoul, South Korea. He also competed at the 1992 Summer Olympics in Barcelona, Spain, but did not finish the competition.

== International competitions ==
Year	Competition	Venue	Position	Event	Notes
Representing Finland
1986	World Junior Championships	Athens, Greece	1st	Decathlon	7623 pts
1986	European Championships	Stuttgart, West Germany	16th	Decathlon	7452 pts
1987	World Championships	Rome, Italy	—	Decathlon	DNF
1988	Summer Olympics	Seoul, South Korea	11th	Decathlon	8143 pts
1990	Hypo-Meeting	Götzis, Austria	4th	Decathlon	8012 pts
1990	European Championships	Split, Yugoslavia	—	Decathlon	DNF
1991	World Championships	Tokyo, Japan	5th	Decathlon	8318 pts
1992	Olympic Games	Barcelona, Spain	—	Decathlon	DNF
1993	Hypo-Meeting	Götzis, Austria	11th	Decathlon	7950 pts
1993	World Championships	Stuttgart, Germany	11th	Decathlon	8000 pts
1995	World Indoor Championships	Barcelona, Spain	—	Heptathlon	DNF
1995	Hypo-Meeting	Götzis, Austria	15th	Decathlon	7982 pts
