= Álvaro Burrell =

Spanish decathlete

Personal information
- Nationality: Spanish
- Born: 29 April 1969 (age 57) Monzón, Spain

Sport
- Sport: Athletics
- Event: Decathlon

Álvaro Burrell (born 29 April 1969) is a Spanish athlete. He competed in the men's decathlon at the 1992 Summer Olympics.
