= Torsten Voss =

East German bobsledder

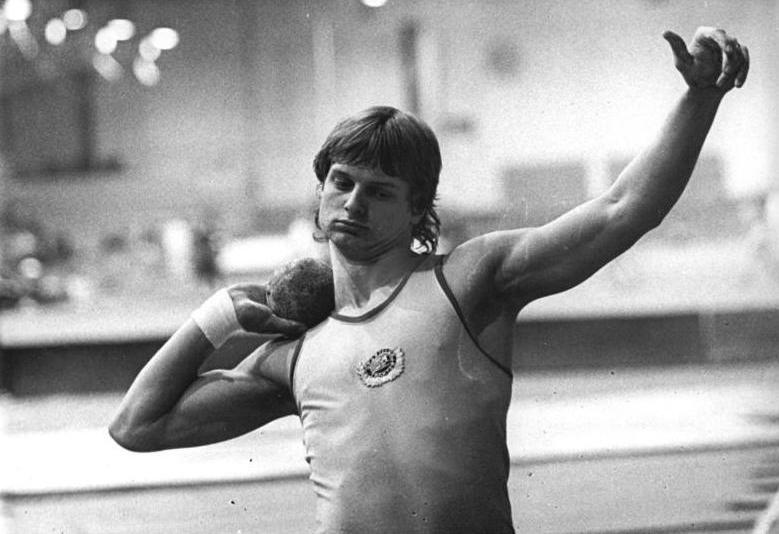
- Torsten Voss (1982)
Medal record
Men's athletics
Representing East Germany
Olympic Games
Silver medal – second place	1988 Seoul	Decathlon
World Championships
Gold medal – first place	1987 Rome	Decathlon
Men's bobsleigh
Representing Germany
World Championships
Silver medal – second place	1997 St. Moritz	Four-man
Bronze medal – third place	1995 Winterberg	Four-man
Bronze medal – third place	1996 Calgary	Four-man

Torsten Voss (sometimes listed as Thorsten Voss; German pronunciation: [ˈtɔʁstn̩ ˈfɔs]; born 24 March 1963 in Güstrow, Mecklenburg-Vorpommern) is a former East German track and field athlete and bobsledder who competed from the late 1980s to the late 1990s.

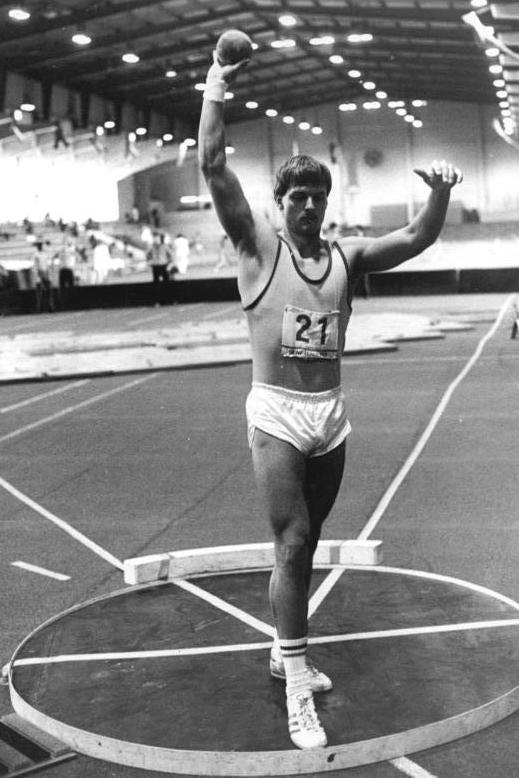
Torsten Voss (1984)

His biggest success was when he won the world title in the decathlon at the 1987 World Championships in Rome as a representative for East Germany. He achieved a personal best score of 8680 points and was chosen as the East German sportsman of the year. In 1988 in the Seoul Summer Olympic Games he won the silver medal behind fellow East German, Christian Schenk. His personal best of 8680 points ranks him sixth among German decathletes, behind Leo Neugebauer, Jürgen Hingsen, Uwe Freimuth, Siegfried Wentz and Frank Busemann.

He became East German champion in the decathlon in 1982, 1983, 1987 and last in 1990, representing the club SC Traktor Schwerin.

In 1994 Voss switched to bobsleigh and was a pusher for Harald Czudaj and Wolfgang Hoppe. He won three medals in the four-man event at the FIBT World Championships with one silver (1997 with Dirk Wiese) and two bronzes (1995 with Czudaj, 1996 with Hoppe). Voss also finished eighth in the four-man event at the 1998 Winter Olympics in Nagano.

As a track and field athlete he was 1.86 meters tall and weighed 88 kilograms.

== Other results in decathlon ==
- 1981 Junior-European championship: 2nd place
- 1982 Junior-World record: 8397 Points
- 1983 World championship in Helsinki
- 1993 (after a break for injury) Second place in the German championship (8037 points)

Awards
Preceded by (East Germany) Olaf Ludwig	East German Sportsman of the Year; 1987	Succeeded by (East Germany) Olaf Ludwig
