= Mike Smith (decathlete) =

Canadian decathlete (born 1967)

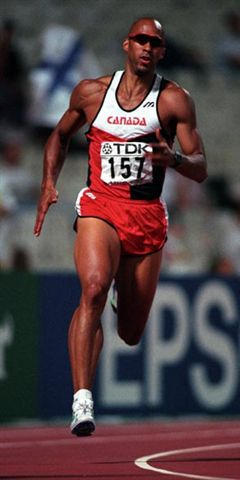
- Smith running the 400 metres, 1997

Personal information
- Full name: Michael Cameron Smith
- Born: September 16, 1967 (age 58) Kenora, Ontario, Canada
- Height: 195 cm (6 ft 5 in)
- Weight: 98 kg (216 lb)

Sport
- Sport: Track
- Event: Decathlon

Achievements and titles
- Personal best(s): Decathlon: 8626, Gotzis, 1996
Medal record
Representing Canada
World Championships
Silver medal – second place	1991 Tokyo	Decathlon
Bronze medal – third place	1995 Gothenburg	Decathlon
Commonwealth Games
Gold medal – first place	1990 Auckland	Decathlon
Gold medal – first place	1994 Victoria	Decathlon
Bronze medal – third place	1998 Kuala Lumpur	Decathlon

Michael Cameron "Mike" Smith (born September 16, 1967) is a Canadian decathlete from Kenora, Ontario.

== Biography ==
Decathlete Mike Smith attended Pinecrest Elementary School, Lakewood Intermediate School, and Beaver Brae Secondary School, then completed his final year of high school at Central Technical School in Toronto, Canada.

Smith attended the University of Toronto Commerce program during his athletic career. He was coached by Andy Higgins while living in Toronto, and then by Les Gramantik when he moved to live and train in Calgary, Alberta in 1994.

Smith won a silver medal at the World Junior Track and Field Championships in 1986. At the 1988 Summer Olympics in Seoul, he placed 14th. At the 1990 Commonwealth Games Smith won a gold medal. He was the silver medal winner at the 1991 World Track and Field Championships, and was the first North American to win the Götzis International Decathlon, which he won again in 1996.

At the 1992 Summer Olympics in Barcelona, Spain, Smith was the opening ceremonies flag bearer for Canada at the Olympics. Unfortunately, during the decathlon, Smith pulled a hamstring and was forced to withdraw on the first day of the two-day competition. In 1994, he won gold at the Commonwealth Games for the second time.

Smith was ranked among the top ten decathletes in the world for ten years in a row, from 1989 to 1998, with his highest rankings being #2 in the world in 1991 and #3 in the world in 1995.

Michael Smith

Personal Best Performances

Smith held the Canadian Record in the decathlon, with a total of 8626 points set in Gotzis Austria in 1996. Smith's record was broken by Damian Warner, with a total of 8659 points, at the 2015 Pan American Games.

The sum of Mike Smith's overall personal bests in the individual disciplines of decathlon totals 9,362 points (the third best ever after Ashton Eaton & Dan O'Brien).

Day 1: 100 metres - 10.70 seconds, Long Jump - 7.76 metres, Shot Put - 18.03 metres, High Jump - 2.14 metres, 400 meters - 47.06 seconds
Day 2: 110 metre hurdles - 14.24 seconds, Discus Throw - 52.90 metres, Pole Vault - 5.20 metres, Javelin Throw - 71.22 metres, 1500 metres - 4:20,04

Total: 9362 points

Smith still holds the world's best performance for the 3 combined throwing events in decathlon (shot put, discus, javelin).

World Ranking	Decathlete	Nation	Points	Shot Put	Discus	Javelin	Venue	Date
1	Michael Smith	CAN	2748	16.94m	52.90m	71.22m	Götzis	26.05.96
2	Bryan Clay	USA	2734	16.25m	53.68m	72.00m	Helsinki	10.08.05
3	William Motti	FRA	2595	16.96m	52.46m	68.20m	Emmitsburg	29.09.91

Mike Smith retired from the sport of decathlon in 1999, commencing a career in financial services and wealth management.

He has also worked for CBC Television Sports and CTV Television as a colour commentator for track and field events. He received a Canadian Screen Award nomination for Best Sports Analyst at the 10th Canadian Screen Awards as a commentator for CBC Television's coverage of the 2020 Summer Olympics.

Michael Smith

== Achievements ==
Year	Competition	Venue	Position	Event	Notes
Representing Canada
1986	World Junior Championships	Athens, Greece	13th (h)	4 × 400 m relay	3:11.26
1986	World Junior Championships	Athens, Greece	2nd	Decathlon	7523 pts
1986	Commonwealth Games	Edinburgh, United Kingdom	7th	Decathlon	7363 pts
1987	Hypo-Meeting	Götzis, Austria	6th	Decathlon	8126 pts
1987	World Championships	Rome, Italy	—	Decathlon	DNF
1988	Hypo-Meeting	Götzis, Austria	12th	Decathlon	8039 pts
1988	Summer Olympics	Seoul, South Korea	14th	Decathlon	8083 pts
1989	Hypo-Meeting	Götzis, Austria	4th	Decathlon	8121 pts
1989	Jeux de la Francophonie	Casablanca, Morocco	1st	Decathlon	8160 pts
1990	Commonwealth Games	Auckland, New Zealand	1st	Decathlon	8525 pts
1991	Hypo-Meeting	Götzis, Austria	1st	Decathlon	8427 pts
1991	World Championships	Tokyo, Japan	2nd	Decathlon	8549 pts
1992	Hypo-Meeting	Götzis, Austria	3rd	Decathlon	8409 pts
1992	Summer Olympics	Barcelona, Spain	—	Decathlon	DNF
1993	World Indoor Championships	Toronto, Canada	2nd	Heptathlon	6279 pts
1993	Hypo-Meeting	Götzis, Austria	3rd	Decathlon	8362 pts
1993	World Championships	Stuttgart, Germany	—	Decathlon	DNF
1994	Hypo-Meeting	Götzis, Austria	4th	Decathlon	8191 pts
1994	Commonwealth Games	Victoria, Canada	1st	Decathlon	8326 pts
1995	Hypo-Meeting	Götzis, Austria	—	Decathlon	DNF
1995	World Championships	Gothenburg, Sweden	3rd	Decathlon	8419 pts
1996	Hypo-Meeting	Götzis, Austria	1st	Decathlon	8626 pts (NR)
1996	Summer Olympics	Atlanta, Georgia, United States	13th	Decathlon	8271 pts
1997	Hypo-Meeting	Götzis, Austria	3rd	Decathlon	8555 pts
1998	Hypo-Meeting	Götzis, Austria	7th	Decathlon	8228 pts
1998	Commonwealth Games	Kuala Lumpur, Malaysia	3rd	Decathlon	8143 pts
1998	World Combined Events Challenge	several places	8th	Decathlon	24,543 pts

== See also ==
- Canadian records in track and field
