= Thorsten Dauth =

German decathlete

Thorsten Dauth (born March 11, 1968, in Bad Nauheim, Hessen) is a retired male decathlete from Germany. He set his personal best score (8164 points) in the men's decathlon on May 28, 1995, at the Hypo-Meeting in Götzis.

== Achievements ==
Year	Competition	Venue	Position	Event	Notes
Representing Germany
1991	Hypo-Meeting	Götzis, Austria	5th	Decathlon	8156 pts
1991	World Championships	Tokyo, Japan	10th	Decathlon	8069 pts
1992	Hypo-Meeting	Götzis, Austria	18th	Decathlon	7421 pts
1992	Olympic Games	Barcelona, Spain	17th	Decathlon	7951 pts
1993	Hypo-Meeting	Götzis, Austria	12th	Decathlon	7841 pts
1994	European Championships	Helsinki, Finland	—	Decathlon	DNF
1995	Hypo-Meeting	Götzis, Austria	7th	Decathlon	8164 pts
1995	World Championships	Gothenburg, Sweden	—	Decathlon	DNF
1996	Hypo-Meeting	Götzis, Austria	10th	Decathlon	8048 pts
