= Sheldon Blockburger =

American decathlete (born 1964)

Personal information
- Born: September 19, 1964 (age 61) Orange, California, United States

Sport
- Sport: Track and field
Medal record
Representing United States
Pan American Games
Bronze medal – third place	1991 Havana	Decathlon

Sheldon Blockburger (born September 19, 1964) is a retired male decathlete from the United States, who competed in the late 1980s and the early 1990s. While competing for LSU, he won the SEC Decathlon Championship in 1986 (breaking the SEC record) and won the 1987 SEC indoor pentathlon title with a world record score of 4451. He set his personal best in the men's decathlon event (8301 points) on June 13, 1990, at the US National Championships in Norwalk, California. He won the bronze medal at the 1991 Pan American Games. He was also the first ever American champion in the indoor heptathlon in 1995. In 1993, he became the first American to win the Italian Multi Stars decathlon, scoring 8296.

In 1994, he became the first American to break 8000 points in the prestigious Hypo Bank meeting in Gotzis, Austria. Blockburger began his college coaching career in 1996 at California Polytechnic State University San Luis Obispo and coached three NCAA track and field champions. He left Cal Poly in 2005 for another coaching position at the university of Arizona. While at Arizona Blockburger coached 11 NCAA champions (9 x high jump, 2 x decathlon) and had 5 runner up finishes. He left for USC in 2015, where he had two NCAA high jump champions and was a part of the 2018 Women's team NCAA Championship. He returned to the University of Arizona in 2018 and left after the COVID-19 shortened 2020 season.

Blockburger coached athletes at the 2003, 2007, 2009, 2011 and 2013 IAAF Track and Field World Championships with high jumper Brigetta Barrett winning the gold medal at 2.00m. He coached in the 2004 and 2012 Olympics with Brigetta Barrett winning the silver medal with an NCAA record jump of 2.03m (6-8”). Blockburger is married to Cynthia Johnson . They have twins born in 2002, Johnnie Blockburger and Alyssa, both of whom are track and field athletes at the University of Southern California.

== Achievements ==
Year	Tournament	Venue	Result	Points
Representing the United States
1987	US National Championships	San Jose, California	6th	7769
1989	US National Championships	Houston, Texas	2nd	8248
1990	US National Championships	Norwalk, California	3rd	8301
1991	US National Championships	New York City	6th	7954
1991	Pan American Games	Havana, Cuba	3rd	7262
1993	US National Championships	Eugene, Oregon	5th	8020
1994	Hypo-Meeting	Götzis, Austria	8th	8064
1994	US National Championships	Knoxville, Tennessee	4th	8281
