= Robert Změlík =

Czech decathlete

Personal information
- Born: 18 April 1969 (age 57) Prostějov, Czechoslovakia

Sport
- Sport: Track and field
Medal record
Representing Czechoslovakia
Olympic Games
Gold medal – first place	1992 Barcelona	Decathlon
European Indoor Championships
Silver medal – second place	1992 Genoa	Heptathlon
Representing Czech Republic
World Indoor Championships
Gold medal – first place	1997 Paris	Heptathlon

Robert Změlík (Czech pronunciation: [ˈrobɛrt ˈzmɲɛliːk], born 18 April 1969) is a Czech track and field athlete who won a gold medal in Olympic decathlon in 1992.

His personal best in decathlon was 8627 points (1992), in Heptathlon 6228 points (1997), both former national records. Změlík's Olympic success was influential for two other Czech decathletes and world record holders, Tomáš Dvořák and Roman Šebrle.

He was a frequent competitor at the Hypo-Meeting in Götzis, Austria, participating in 1989, 1991, 1992, 1993 and 1995. He made the podium for the first time in the 1991 Hypo-Meeting, taking second place with a score of 8346 points, then had his first win at the 1992 Hypo-Meeting, where he set a career-best score.

== International competitions ==
Year	Competition	Venue	Position	Event	Notes
Representing Czechoslovakia
1988	World Junior Championships	Sudbury, Canada	2nd	Decathlon	7659 pts
1989	European Indoor Championships	The Hague, Netherlands	13th	Long jump	7.48 m
1989	Universiade	Duisburg, West Germany	5th	Decathlon	7793 pts
1990	European Indoor Championships	Glasgow, United Kingdom	9th	Long jump	7.76 m
1990	European Championships	Split, Yugoslavia	4th	Decathlon	8249 pts
1991	World Indoor Championships	Seville, Spain	–	60 m hurdles	DNF
1991	World Indoor Championships	Seville, Spain	6th	Long jump	7.83 m
1991	World Championships	Tokyo, Japan	4th	Decathlon	8379 pts
1992	European Indoor Championships	Genoa, Italy	21st (h)	60 m hurdles	7.95 s
1992	European Indoor Championships	Genoa, Italy	2nd	Heptathlon	6118 pts
1992	Olympic Games	Barcelona, Spain	1st	Decathlon	8611 pts
Representing the Czech Republic
1993	World Indoor Championships	Toronto, Canada	–	Heptathlon	DNF
1993	World Championships	Stuttgart, Germany	–	Decathlon	DNF
1995	World Championships	Gothenburg, Sweden	14th	Decathlon	7963 pts
1996	Olympic Games	Atlanta, United States	7th	Decathlon	8422 pts
1997	World Indoor Championships	Paris, France	1st	Heptathlon	6228 pts
1997	World Championships	Athens, Greece	–	Decathlon	DNF
