= René Schmidheiny =

Swiss bobsledder and decathlete (born 1967)

Personal information
- Born: 4 January 1967 (age 59) Basel, Switzerland

Sport
- Sport: Track and field Bobsleigh

René Schmidheiny (born 4 January 1967) is a Swiss bobsledder who competed in the mid-1990s. At the 1994 Winter Olympics in Lillehammer, he finished seventh in the four-man event.

Prior to being in bobsleigh, Schmidheiny also competed in athletics as a decathlete. He competed in the United States for the University of Arizona and still holds the decathlon records at Sun Devil Stadium in the discus and javelin throws as of 2007. He was an NCAA All-American two years prior to Matthew Dallow, another Arizona decathlete who transitioned to Olympic bobsled.
