= Henrik Dagård =

Swedish decathlete

Medal record

Men's athletics

Representing Sweden

European Championships
Silver medal – second place	1994 Helsinki	Decathlon

Olof Henrik Dagård (born 7 August 1969 in Halmstad) is a retired Swedish decathlete.

== Achievements ==
Year	Competition	Venue	Position	Event	Notes
Representing Sweden
1988	World Junior Championships	Sudbury, Canada	4th	Decathlon	7453 pts
1990	Hypo-Meeting	Götzis, Austria	5th	Decathlon	8004 pts
1990	European Championships	Split, Yugoslavia	9th	Decathlon	8052 pts
1991	Hypo-Meeting	Götzis, Austria	8th	Decathlon	7900 pts
1993	Hypo-Meeting	Götzis, Austria	10th	Decathlon	7965 pts
1994	European Indoor Championships	Paris, France	2nd	Heptathlon	6119 pts
1994	Hypo-Meeting	Götzis, Austria	2nd	Decathlon	8359 pts
1994	European Championships	Helsinki, Finland	2nd	Decathlon	8362 pts
1995	World Indoor Championships	Barcelona, Spain	3rd	Heptathlon	6142 pts
1995	World Championships	Gothenburg, Sweden	16th	Decathlon	7899 pts
1998	European Championships	Budapest, Hungary	15th	Decathlon	7930 pts
1999	Hypo-Meeting	Götzis, Austria	9th	Decathlon	7988 pts
1999	World Championships	Seville, Spain	7th	Decathlon	8150 pts
1999	IAAF World Combined Events Challenge	several places	9th	Decathlon	24,132 pts
2000	Hypo-Meeting	Götzis, Austria	14th	Decathlon	8050 pts
2000	Olympic Games	Sydney, Australia	10th	Decathlon	8178 pts

== Personal bests ==
- 100 metres - 10.58 (1989)
- 400 metres - 46.71 (1994)
- 1500 metres - 4:34.46 (1990)
- 110 metres hurdles - 13.97 (1994)
- High jump - 2.07 (1989)
- Pole vault - 5.10 (2000)
- Long jump - 7.48 (1989)
- Shot put - 15.45 (1993)
- Discus throw - 45.64 (1994)
- Javelin throw - 69.26 (1993)
- Decathlon - 8403 (1994)
