= Rob Muzzio =

American decathlete

Robert ("Rob") Muzzio (born 25 June 1964, in Würzburg, West Germany to American parents) is a retired male decathlete from the United States, who represented Team USA at the 1992 Summer Olympics. He retired in 1996 after fifteen years of competition. His personal best was 8237 points, achieved at the World Championships in 1993. Muzzio attended George Mason University in Fairfax, VA and was the first decathlete in NCAA Division I history to win back-to-back NCAA decathlon titles in 1984 & 85.

Currently, he is the pole vaulting coach for the Track and Field team at Robinson Secondary School in Fairfax, where he attended high school. Rob has a wife, Natalie, and two children, Joey and Maria.

== Achievements ==
Year	Tournament	Venue	Result	Points
Representing the United States
1993	World Championships	Stuttgart, Germany	8th	8237
1992	Olympic Games	Barcelona, Spain	5th	8195
1991	World Championships	Tokyo, Japan	20th	7133
1987	World Championships	Rome, Italy	13th	8017
