= Mykhailo Medvid =

Ukrainian decathlete (born 1964)

Personal information
- Born: 30 January 1964 (age 62) Kyiv, Soviet Union

Sport
- Sport: Track and field
Medal record
Representing Soviet Union
Summer Universiade
Silver medal – second place	1989 Duisburg	Decathlon

Mykhailo Medvid (Ukrainian: Михайло Медвідь, Russian: Михаил Медведь Mikhail Medved; born 30 January 1964) is a retired male decathlete who first represented the Soviet Union during his career and later Ukraine. He set his personal best score (8330 points) on July 31, 1988 at a meet in Kyiv.

== Achievements ==
Year	Competition	Venue	Position	Notes
Representing Soviet Union
1990	Goodwill Games	Seattle, United States	3rd	8330
1991	Hypo-Meeting	Götzis, Austria	3rd	8278
1991	World Championships	Tokyo, Japan	—	DNF
1992	Hypo-Meeting	Götzis, Austria	—	DNF
Representing Ukraine
1993	Hypo-Meeting	Götzis, Austria	7th	8146
1994	Hypo-Meeting	Götzis, Austria	—	DNF
