= Christian Schenk =

German Olympic decathlete

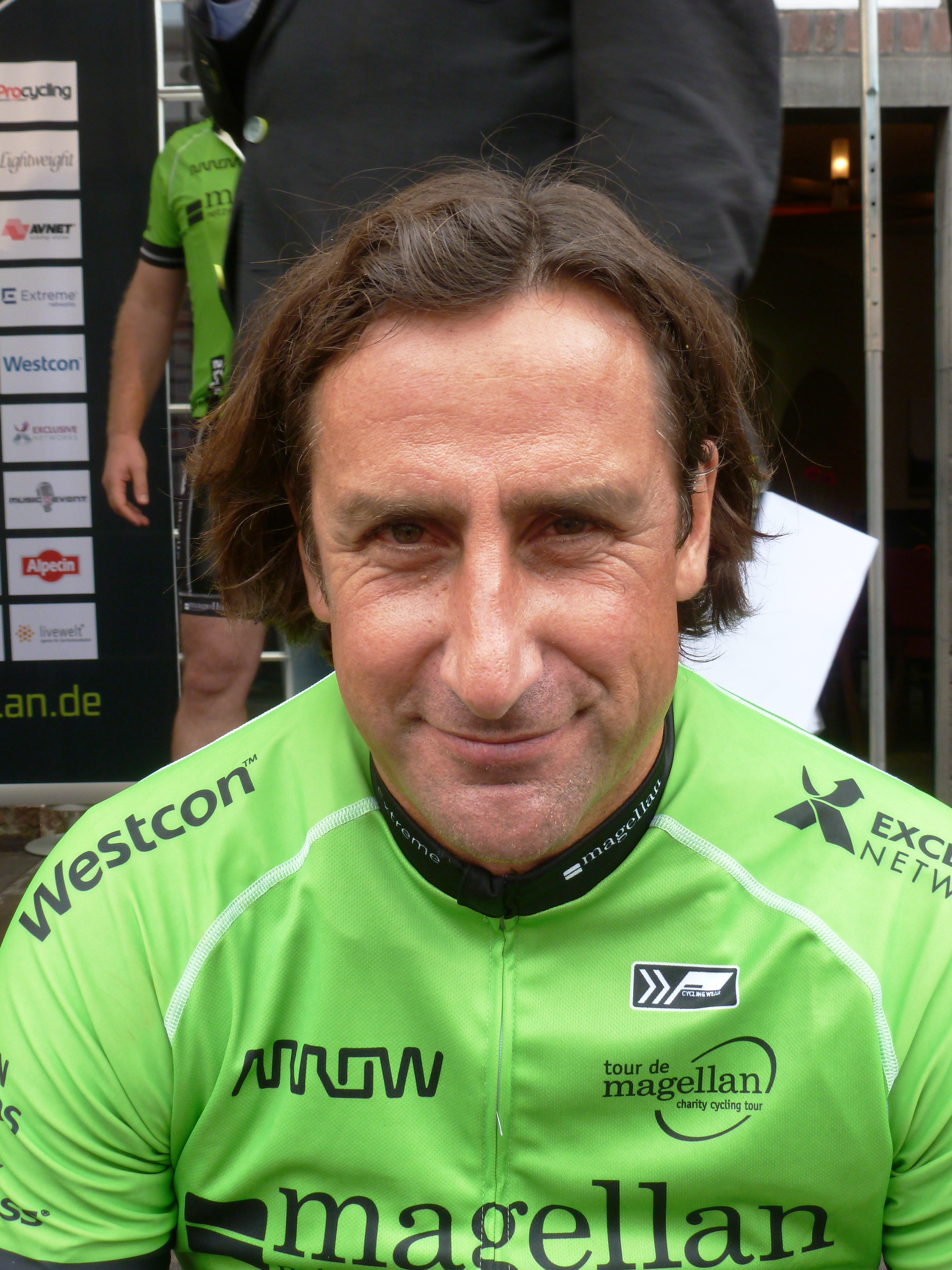
- Christian Schenk in 2014

Medal record

Men's athletics

Representing East Germany

Olympic Games
Gold medal – first place	1988 Seoul	Decathlon

European Championships
Bronze medal – third place	1990 Split	Decathlon

Representing Germany

World Championships
Bronze medal – third place	1991 Tokyo	Decathlon

Christian Schenk (German pronunciation: [ˈkʁɪsti̯a(ː)n ˈʃɛŋk]; born 9 February 1965 in Rostock, East Germany) is a former decathlete who competed for East Germany and Germany. He won the gold medal in the decathlon in the 1988 Summer Olympics, held in Seoul, South Korea.

Schenk also won a bronze medal at the 1991 World Championships in Athletics in Tokyo. He missed the 1992 Summer Olympics in Barcelona because of an injury and came fourth in the 1993 World Championships in Athletics in Stuttgart.

His personal best was 8500 points, achieved in August 1993 in Stuttgart. This ranks him ninth among German decathletes, behind Jürgen Hingsen, Uwe Freimuth, Siegfried Wentz, Frank Busemann, Torsten Voss, Guido Kratschmer, Paul Meier and Siegfried Stark. Schenk cleared 2.27 m (7 ft 5 1/4 in) in the 1988 Seoul Olympics to share the World Decathlon Best in high jump with Rolf Beilschmidt, until the Canadian Olympic high jump gold medalist Derek Drouin improved the record by 1 centimeter in an decathlon competition in 2017. Schenk was noted for his use of the old-fashioned straddle technique, at a time when the Fosbury flop had become almost universal in competitive high jumping. He retired in 1994.

In August 2018, Schenk confessed that he had used chlorodehydromethyltestosterone during his career, his voluntary doping confession was greeted as a positive signal by the International Olympic Committee.

== Personal bests ==
Event	Performance	Location	Date	Points
Decathlon	8,500 points	Stuttgart	August 20, 1993	8,500 points
100 metres	11.21	Götzis	May 25, 1985	825 points
Long jump	7.73 m (25 ft 4 1/4 in)	Götzis	June 16, 1990	1,079 points
Shot put	15.77 m (51 ft 8 3/4 in)	Tokyo	August 29, 1991	869 points
High jump	2.27 m (7 ft 5 1/4 in)	Seoul	September 28 1988	1,152 points
400 metres	48.78	Stuttgart	August 19, 1993	932 points
110 metres hurdles	14.78	Götzis	June 16, 1991	930 points
Discus throw	49.68 m (162 ft 11 3/4 in)	Götzis	May 31, 1992	871 points
Pole vault	4.90 m (16 ft 3/4 in)	Tokyo	August 30, 1991	967 points
Javelin throw	65.32 m (214 ft 3 1/2 in)	Stuttgart	August 20, 1993	893 points
1500 metres	4:13.77	Split	August 29, 1990	700 points
Virtual Best Performance				9,218 points
