= Michael Kohnle =

German decathlete

Michael Kohnle (born 3 May 1970 in Göppingen, Baden-Württemberg) is a retired male decathlete from Germany. He set his personal best score (8302 points) in the men's decathlon on 28 May 1995 in Götzis. Kohnle was the last national champion for West Germany (1990).

== Achievements ==
| Year | Competition | Venue | Position | Event | Notes |
Representing West Germany
| 1988 | World Junior Championships | Sudbury, Canada | 1st | Decathlon | 7729 pts |
| 1990 | Hypo-Meeting | Götzis, Austria | 9th | Decathlon | 7930 pts |
Representing Germany
| 1991 | Hypo-Meeting | Götzis, Austria | 6th | Decathlon | 8062 pts |
| 1991 | World Championships | Tokyo, Japan | 12th | Decathlon | 8000 pts |
| 1993 | Hypo-Meeting | Götzis, Austria | 9th | Decathlon | 8006 pts |
| 1993 | World Championships | Stuttgart, Germany | 9th | Decathlon | 8075 pts |
| 1995 | Hypo-Meeting | Götzis, Austria | 3rd | Decathlon | 8302 pts |
| 1995 | World Championships | Gothenburg, Sweden | — | Decathlon | DNF |
