= 1982 European Athletics Championships – Women's heptathlon =

Women's heptathlon at the European Athletics Championships

These are the official results of the Women's Heptathlon competition at the 1982 European Championships in Athens, Greece, held at Olympic Stadium "Spiros Louis" on 9 and 10 September 1982.

== Medalists ==
| Gold | Ramona Neubert; East Germany (GDR) |
| Silver | Sabine Möbius; East Germany (GDR) |
| Bronze | Sabine Everts; West Germany (FRG) |

== Results ==
=== Final ===
9/10 September

The highest mark recorded in each event is highlighted in yellow

| Rank | Name | Nationality | 100m H | HJ | SP | 200m | LJ | JT | 800m | Points | Notes |
|---|---|---|---|---|---|---|---|---|---|---|---|
| 1st place, gold medalist(s) | Ramona Neubert | East Germany | 13.61 | 1.83 | 15.02 | 23.40 | 6.63 | 42.48 | 2:11.06 | 6622 (6664) | CR |
| 2nd place, silver medalist(s) | Sabine Möbius | East Germany | 12.89 | 1.83 | 13.51 | 23.71 | 6.68 | 41.40 | 2:11.55 | 6595 (6629) | |
| 3rd place, bronze medalist(s) | Sabine Everts | West Germany | 13.46 | 1.89 | 11.81 | 23.76 | 6.66 | 36.46 | 2:08.71 | 6420 (6445) | |
| 4 | Anke Vater | East Germany | 13.81 | 1.83 | 15.26 | 24.17 | 6.31 | 34.86 | 2:08.09 | 6389 (6371) | |
| 5 | Natalya Shubenkova | Soviet Union | 13.37 | 1.80 | 13.23 | 24.31 | 6.03 | 43.80 | 2:08.76 | 6361 (6323) | |
| 6 | Valentina Dimitrova | Bulgaria | 14.27 | 1.80 | 15.20 | 25.11 | 6.29 | 43.28 | 2:09.41 | 6326 (6313) | |
| 7 | Judy Livermore | United Kingdom | 13.48 | 1.89 | 14.00 | 24.76 | 6.02 | 37.08 | 2:11.49 | 6286 (6259) | |
| 8 | Mila Kolyadina | Soviet Union | 13.94 | 1.74 | 16.04 | 24.97 | 6.08 | 44.22 | 2:27.56 | 6101 (6057) | |
| 9 | Tineke Hidding | Netherlands | 14.00 | 1.77 | 13.04 | 24.63 | 6.04 | 37.20 | 2:15.45 | 6016 (5932) | |
| 10 | Corina Țifrea | Romania | 13.99 | 1.74 | 12.27 | 24.89 | 6.22 | 39.82 | 2:16.03 | 5988 (5919) | |
| 11 | Kristine Tånnander | Sweden | 13.94 | 1.77 | 12.58 | 25.09 | 5.95 | 40.04 | 2:15.09 | 5984 (5900) | |
| 12 | Zsuzsa Vanyek | Hungary | 14.27 | 1.77 | 12.61 | 25.09 | 6.48 | 33.84 | 2:15.14 | 5957 (5905) | |
| 13 | Małgorzata Nowak | Poland | 14.02 | 1.68 | 14.55 | 24.98 | 5.95 | 39.34 | 2:19.09 | 5948 (5851) | |
| 14 | Florence Picaut | France | 13.74 | 1.80 | 13.05 | 25.88 | 5.81 | 39.80 | 2:20.39 | 5897 (5805) | |
| 15 | Annette Tånnander | Sweden | 14.16 | 1.80 | 11.97 | 26.75 | 5.92 | 45.62 | 2:21.33 | 5810 (5732) | |
| 16 | Corinne Schneider | Switzerland | 14.52 | 1.77 | 12.45 | 26.20 | 5.69 | 43.34 | 2:20.41 | 5737 (5623) | |
| 17 | Anne Kyllönen | Finland | 14.44 | 1.77 | 11.69 | 25.78 | 5.76 | 31.24 | 2:14.97 | 5623 (5486) | |

== Participation ==
According to an unofficial count, 17 athletes from 13 countries participated in the event.

- Bulgaria (1)
- East Germany (3)
- Finland (1)
- France (1)
- Hungary (1)
- Netherlands (1)
- Poland (1)
- Romania (1)
- Soviet Union (2)
- Sweden (2)
- Switzerland (1)
- United Kingdom (1)
- West Germany (1)

== See also ==
- 1978 Women's European Championships Pentathlon (Prague)
- 1980 Women's Olympic Pentathlon (Moscow)
- 1983 Women's World Championships Heptathlon (Helsinki)
- 1984 Women's Olympic Heptathlon (Los Angeles)
- 1986 Women's European Championships Heptathlon (Stuttgart)
- 1987 Women's World Championships Heptathlon (Rome)
- 1988 Women's Olympic Heptathlon (Seoul)
