= 1983 World Championships in Athletics – Women's heptathlon =

The Women's Heptathlon competition at the 1983 World Championships in Athletics in Helsinki, Finland started on Monday 8 August 1983 and ended on Tuesday 9 August 1983. There were a total number of 26 participating athletes, including six non-finishers. The winning margin was 52 points.

== Medalists ==
Gold	Ramona Neubert; East Germany (GDR)
Silver	Sabine Paetz; East Germany (GDR)
Bronze	Anke Vater; East Germany (GDR)

== Schedule ==
Monday, August 8, 1983
1. 100 m hurdles
2. High Jump
3. Shot Put
4. 200 m

Tuesday, August 9, 1983
5. Long Jump
6. Javelin Throw
7. 800 m

== Records ==
Standing records prior to the 1983 World Athletics Championships
World Record	Ramona Neubert (GDR)	6836	June 19, 1983	Moscow, Soviet Union
Event Record	New event			

== Results ==
The highest mark recorded in each event is highlighted in yellow

Rank	Athlete	Points	100mh	HJ	SP	200m	LJ	JT	800m
1st place, gold medalist(s)	Ramona Neubert (GDR)	6714	13.29	1.80	15.38	23.27	6.67	45.12	2:11.34
2nd place, silver medalist(s)	Sabine Paetz (GDR)	6662	13.11	1.83	14.23	23.60	6.68	44.52	2:11.59
3rd place, bronze medalist(s)	Anke Vater (GDR)	6532	13.58	1.86	14.05	23.49	6.32	37.84	2:05.64
4	Sabine Everts (FRG)	6398	13.50	1.86	12.32	23.82	6.46	36.36	2:06.80
5	Valentina Dimitrova (BUL)	6362	14.21	1.80	15.67	25.08	6.11	44.60	2:08.10
6	Yekaterina Smirnova (URS)	6321	13.36	1.83	13.77	24.48	5.66	45.76	2:10.98
7	Glynis Nunn (AUS)	6195	13.17	1.74	12.98	24.02	6.31	32.64	2:10.96
8	Tineke Hidding (NED)	6155	13.77	1.77	12.22	24.19	6.30	38.62	2:12.46
9	Annette Tånnander (SWE)	5977	14.00	1.83	11.86	26.10	6.09	45.24	2:17.86
10	Marcela Koblasová (TCH)	5965	14.17	1.74	14.99	25.15	6.04	40.58	2:24.96
11	Marlene Harmon (USA)	5925	14.17	1.74	11.91	24.92	6.17	36.06	2:12.16
12	Kristine Tånnander (SWE)	5922	14.25	1.80	12.70	25.13	5.58	39.36	2:12.38
13	Anne Kyllönen (FIN)	5866	14.33	1.80	12.87	25.77	5.88	36.16	2:13.77
14	Corinne Schneider (SUI)	5851	14.62	1.83	12.06	25.81	5.73	46.22	2:19.68
15	Florence Picaut (FRA)	5766	13.85	1.80	12.08	25.64	5.90	32.98	2:19.22
16	Terry Genge (NZL)	5739	13.99	1.59	11.96	25.21	5.92	39.26	2:14.53
17	Helena Otahalová (TCH)	5721	14.10	1.74	12.92	24.95	5.58	38.68	2:26.42
18	Melitta Aigner (AUT)	5629	15.39	1.65	14.13	26.18	5.52	42.88	2:16.47
19	Dalila Tayebi (ALG)	4976	15.55	1.65	09.95	25.72	5.71	26.46	2:31.55
20	Patricia Meigham (GUA)	3955	17.96	1.41	08.23	26.08	4.10	19.86	2:20.10
	Jane Frederick (USA)	DNF	13.72	1.83	14.75	25.16	6.00	45.62	DNS
	Judy Livermore (GBR)	DNF	13.23	1.92	13.85	24.93	6.16	NM	DNS
	Conceição Geremias (BRA)	DNF	14.03	1.74	13.35	24.88	5.85	NM	DNS
	Jackie Joyner (USA)	DNF	13.69	1.86	12.73	23.73	DNS		
	Zeina Mina El-Jas (LIB)	DNF	16.15	1.53	DNS				
	Natalya Shubenkova (URS)	DNF	14.12	DNS					

== See also ==
- 1980 Women's Olympic Heptathlon (Moscow)
- 1982 Women's European Championships Heptathlon (Athens)
- 1984 Women's Olympic Heptathlon (Los Angeles)
- 1986 Women's European Championships Heptathlon (Stuttgart)
- 1987 Women's World Championships Heptathlon (Rome)
- 1988 Women's Olympic Heptathlon (Seoul)
