= Athletics at the 1984 Summer Olympics – Women's heptathlon =

Women's heptathlon at the Games of the XXIII Olympiad
- Venue: Los Angeles Memorial Coliseum
- Date: 6 August 1984; 7 August 1984
- Competitors: 23 from 14 nations
- Winning result: 6390 OR

Medalists
1st place, gold medalist(s)		Glynis Nunn; Australia
2nd place, silver medalist(s)		Jackie Joyner; United States
3rd place, bronze medalist(s)		Sabine Everts; West Germany

These are the official results of the Women's Heptathlon competition at the 1984 Summer Olympics in Los Angeles, California.

== Abbreviations ==
DNS	did not start
NM	no mark
OR	olympic record
WR	world record
AR	area record
NR	national record
PB	personal best
SB	season best

== Final standings ==
The highest mark recorded in each event is highlighted in yellow

Rank	Athlete	Nationality	100m H	HJ	SP	200m	LJ	JT	800m	Points	Notes
1st place, gold medalist(s)	Glynis Nunn	Australia	13.02	1.80	12.82	24.06	6.66	35.58	2:10.57	6390	
2nd place, silver medalist(s)	Jackie Joyner	United States	13.63	1.80	14.39	24.05	6.11	44.52	2:13.03	6385	
3rd place, bronze medalist(s)	Sabine Everts	West Germany	13.54	1.89	12.49	24.05	6.71	32.62	2:09.05	6363	
4	Cindy Greiner	United States	13.71	1.83	13.36	24.40	6.15	40.86	2:11.75	6281	
5	Judy Simpson	Great Britain	13.07	1.86	13.86	24.95	6.33	33.64	2:13.01	6280	
6	Sabine Braun	West Germany	13.61	1.80	12.09	24.22	6.10	44.14	2:12.48	6236	
7	Tineke Hidding	Netherlands	13.70	1.74	13.48	24.12	6.35	33.94	2:12.84	6147	
8	Kim Hagger	Great Britain	13.39	1.86	12.29	24.72	6.37	35.42	2:18.44	6127	
9	Birgit Dressel	West Germany	14.05	1.86	12.72	25.59	6.15	42.62	2:16.68	6082	
10	Corinne Schneider	Switzerland	14.12	1.86	12.26	25.33	5.72	46.60	2:15.89	6042	
11	Marjon Wijnsma	Netherlands	13.93	1.83	12.57	24.91	6.06	34.12	2:12.91	6015	
12	Kristine Tånnander	Sweden	14.01	1.80	12.74	25.03	5.57	42.34	2:13.93	5985	
13	Florence Picaut	France	13.83	1.80	13.08	25.09	5.92	34.86	2:19.17	5914	
14	Annette Tånnander	Sweden	14.06	1.83	12.37	26.40	6.27	41.46	2:22.00	5908	
15	Jill Ross Giffen	Canada	13.72	1.68	11.71	25.22	6.00w	39.38	2:11.97	5904	
16	Connie Polman-Tuin	Canada	14.18	1.56	13.16	24.68	5.89	36.36	2:22.34	5648	
17	Donna Smellie	Canada	14.09	1.68	12.25	25.29	6.04	34.08	2:25.10	5638	
18	Tsai Lee-chiao	Chinese Taipei	14.78	1.74	11.73	25.41	5.57	32.84	2:25.03	5447	
19	Iammogapi Launa	Papua New Guinea	15.43	1.53	11.85	26.26	5.04w	46.50	2:28.85	5148	
20	Manuela Marxer	Liechtenstein	15.18	1.62	10.63	26.80	5.08	33.84	2:33.17	4913	
	Conceição Geremias	Brazil	13.98	1.74	13.15	25.00	5.65	NM	DNS	DNF	
	Chantal Beaugeant	France	13.81	1.68	11.36	25.84	DNS	–	–	DNF	
	Jodi Anderson	United States	14.40	1.65	11.02	DNS	–	–	–	DNF	

== See also ==
- 1980 Women's Olympic Pentathlon (Moscow)
- 1982 Women's European Championship Heptathlon (Athens)
- 1983 Women's World Championship Heptathlon (Helsinki)
- 1984 Women's Friendship Games Heptathlon (Prague)
- 1986 Women's European Championship Heptathlon (Stuttgart)
- 1987 Women's World Championship Heptathlon (Rome)
- 1988 Women's Olympic Heptathlon (Seoul)
