= 1987 World Championships in Athletics – Women's heptathlon =

These are the official results of the women's heptathlon competition at the 1987 World Championships in Athletics in Rome, Italy. There were a total number of 25 participating athletes, including six non-finishers. The competition started on 31 August and ended on 1 September 1987. The winning margin was 564 points. As of 2024, this is the only time the heptathlon has been won by more than 400 points at these championships.

The corresponding Olympic record is 517 points which was set in 2004 by Carolina Klüft of Sweden.

== Medalists ==
Gold	Jackie Joyner-Kersee; United States (USA)
Silver	Larisa Nikitina; Soviet Union (URS)
Bronze	Jane Frederick; United States (USA)

== Schedule ==
August 31, 1987
1. 100 m hurdles
2. High Jump
3. Shot Put
4. 200 m

September 1, 1987
5. Long Jump
6. Javelin Throw
7. 800 m

== Records ==
Standing records prior to the 1987 World Athletics Championships
World Record	Jackie Joyner (USA)	7161	August 2, 1986	Houston, United States
Event Record	Ramona Neubert (GDR)	6714	August 9, 1983	Helsinki, Finland
Broken records during the 1987 World Athletics Championships
Event Record	Jackie Joyner-Kersee (USA)	7128	September 1, 1987	Rome, Italy

== Results ==
The highest mark recorded in each event is highlighted in yellow

Rank	Athlete	Points	100mh	HJ	SP	200m	LJ	JT	800m
1st place, gold medalist(s)	Jackie Joyner-Kersee (USA)	7128 CR	12.91	1.90	16.00	22.95	7.14	45.68	2:16.29
2nd place, silver medalist(s)	Larisa Nikitina (URS)	6564	13.77	1.87	15.66	24.48	6.33	55.24	2:27.01
3rd place, bronze medalist(s)	Jane Frederick (USA)	6502	13.65	1.78	16.30	24.69	6.33	46.62	2:13.77
4	Anke Behmer (GDR)	6460	13.59	1.81	13.77	23.54	6.67	35.82	2:09.03
5	Liliana Năstase (ROU)	6325	13.09	1.75	13.11	24.09	6.59	41.84	2:17.91
6	Marion Reichelt (GDR)	6296	13.65	1.81	13.39	24.17	6.46	38.64	2:12.76
7	Marianna Maslennikova (URS)	6228	13.46	1.84	13.22	24.41	6.12	35.42	2:08.12
8	Zhu Yuqing (CHN)	6211	13.37	1.78	15.12	23.99	6.10	43.40	2:27.45
9	Kim Hagger (GBR)	6167	13.24	1.81	12.63	24.68	6.56	35.64	2:17.59
10	Jane Flemming (AUS)	6149	13.50	1.81	13.21	23.75	6.20	38.24	2:20.58
11	Nadine Debois (FRA)	6139	13.64	1.72	13.22	24.23	6.25	34.70	2:05.17
12	Cindy Greiner (USA)	6042	13.76	1.72	13.46	24.45	6.29	36.84	2:13.99
13	Tineke Hidding (NED)	6040	13.77	1.72	13.11	24.18	6.18	40.14	2:16.10
14	Svetlana Buraga (URS)	5982	13.15	1.75	13.36	24.17	5.89	33.76	2:15.58
15	Joanne Mulliner (GBR)	5842	13.84	1.75	12.86	24.80	5.80	36.72	2:13.83
16	Ragne Kytölä (FIN)	5791	14.27	1.78	11.78	25.16	5.92	38.96	2:14.03
17	Cornelia Heinrich (FRG)	5664	14.48	1.75	14.04	25.67	5.94	41.06	2:29.90
18	Sabine Braun (FRG)	5621	14.14	1.75	12.42	25.49	5.77	37.74	2:20.94
19	Connie Polman-Tuin (CAN)	5608	14.35	1.66	12.85	25.27	6.10	35.80	2:19.77
	Eva Karblom (SWE)	DNF	14.40	1.66	13.61	25.10	6.25	39.06	DNS
	Ingrid Meilicke (PAR)	DNF	15.19	1.51	10.35	27.28	5.14	34.70	DNS
	Zuzana Lajbnerová (TCH)	DNF	14.15	1.75	14.06	25.59	DNS		
	Manuela Marxer (LIE)	DNF	14.76	1.66	10.69	DNS			
	Chantal Beaugeant (FRA)	DNF	14.62	DNS					
	Alessandra Becatti (ITA)	DNF	DNF						

== See also ==
- 1983 Women's World Championships Heptathlon (Helsinki)
- 1984 Women's Olympic Heptathlon (Los Angeles)
- 1986 Women's European Championships Heptathlon (Stuttgart)
- 1987 Hypo-Meeting
- 1988 Women's Olympic Heptathlon (Seoul)
- 1990 Women's European Championships Heptathlon (Split)
- 1991 Women's World Championships Heptathlon (Tokyo)
- 1992 Women's Olympic Heptathlon (Barcelona)
