= 1986 European Athletics Championships – Women's heptathlon =

Women's heptathlon at the European Athletics Championships

These are the official results of the Women's heptathlon competition at the 1986 European Championships in Stuttgart, West Germany, held at Neckarstadion on 29 and 30 August 1986.

== Medalists ==
Gold	Anke Behmer; East Germany (GDR)
Silver	Natalya Schubenkova; Soviet Union (URS)
Bronze	(United Kingdom) Judy Simpson; Great Britain (GBR)

== Results ==
=== Final ===
29/30 August

The highest mark recorded in each event is highlighted in yellow

Rank	Name	Nationality	100m H	HJ	SP	200m	LJ	JT	800m	Points	Notes
1st place, gold medalist(s)	Anke Behmer	East Germany	13.25	1.77	14.50	23.46	6.79	40.24	2:03.96	6717	CR
2nd place, silver medalist(s)	Natalya Shubenkova	Soviet Union	13.33	1.80	13.68	23.92	6.54 w	44.98	2:04.40	6645	
3rd place, bronze medalist(s)	Judy Simpson	United Kingdom	13.05	1.92	14.73	25.09	6.56 w	40.92	2:11.70	6623	NR
4	Birgit Dressel	West Germany	13.56	1.92	14.12	24.68	6.28	45.70	2:15.78	6487	
5	Marianna Maslennikova	Soviet Union	13.43	1.86	13.35	24.50	6.46	38.22	2:09.58	6396	
6	Małgorzata Nowak	Poland	13.39	1.80	16.39	24.52	6.12	41.90	2:19.36	6352	
7	Valda Ruškytė	Soviet Union	13.51	1.77	14.58	25.64	6.36 w	46.46	2:12.76	6331	
8	Chantal Beaugeant	France	13.72	1.83	12.29	24.89	6.12	46.26	2:12.06	6221	
9	Kim Hagger	United Kingdom	13.38	1.83	12.23	24.61	6.70	36.60	2:20.55	6173	
10	Emilia Dimitrova	Bulgaria	13.88	1.71	13.29	23.42	6.01	39.38	2:10.93	6105	
11	Tineke Hidding	Netherlands	13.78	1.68	13.62	24.25	6.23	35.54	2:14.73	5966	
12	Nadine Debois	France	13.97	1.74	12.61	24.59	6.43	29.76	2:08.52	5956	
13	Liliane Menissier	France	13.98	1.80	11.80	25.31	5.90 w	37.44	2:22.04	5699	
14	Joanne Mulliner	United Kingdom	14.33	1.74	13.21	24.91	6.11 w	27.40	2:23.01	5564	
	Rita Heggli	Switzerland	13.34	1.68	10.30	25.12	NM	39.14		DNF	
	Yvonne Hasler	Liechtenstein	14.73	1.59	10.40	25.39	5.49 w			DNF	
	Corinne Schneider	Switzerland	14.13	1.80	11.56					DNF	
	Birgit Clarius	West Germany	16.47	1.77	14.41					DNF	
	Eva Karblom	Sweden	14.40	1.68						DNF	

== Participation ==
According to an unofficial count, 19 athletes from 11 countries participated in the event.

- Bulgaria (1)
- East Germany (1)
- France (3)
- Liechtenstein (1)
- Netherlands (1)
- Poland (1)
- Soviet Union (3)
- Sweden (1)
- Switzerland (2)
- United Kingdom (3)
- West Germany (2)

== See also ==
- 1982 Women's European Championships Heptathlon (Athens)
- 1983 Women's World Championships Heptathlon (Helsinki)
- 1984 Women's Olympic Heptathlon (Los Angeles)
- 1986 Hypo-Meeting
- 1987 Women's World Championships Heptathlon (Rome)
- 1988 Women's Olympic Heptathlon (Seoul)
- 1990 Women's European Championships Heptathlon (Split)
