= 1984 in the sport of athletics =

1984 in athletics
- Major world events: Olympic Games

This article contains an overview of the year 1984 in the sport of athletics.

== International Events ==
- African Championships in Rabat, Morocco
- Balkan Games in Athens, Greece
- European Indoor Championships in Gothenburg, Sweden
- World Cross Country Championships in New York, United States
- Olympic Games in Los Angeles, United States

== World records ==
=== Men ===
Event	Athlete	Mark	Date	Venue
10,000 metres	Fernando Mamede (POR)	27:13.81	2 July	Stockholm, Sweden
4 × 100 m Relay	United States (USA) • Sam Graddy • Ron Brown • Calvin Smith • Carl Lewis	37.83	August 11	Los Angeles
High Jump	Zhu Jianhua (CHN)	2.39m	June 10	Eberstadt, West Germany
Pole vault	Sergey Bubka (URS)	5.85m	26 May	Bratislava, Czechoslovakia
Pole vault	Sergey Bubka (URS)	5.88m	2 June	Paris, France
Pole vault	Sergey Bubka (URS)	5.90m	13 July	London
Pole vault	Thierry Vigneron (FRA)	5.91m	31 August	Rome, Italy
Pole vault	Sergey Bubka (URS)	5.94m	31 August	Rome, Italy
Hammer	Yuriy Syedikh (URS)	86.34m	3 July	Cork, Ireland
Javelin (old)	Uwe Hohn (GDR)	104.80m	20 July	Berlin, East Germany
Decathlon	Jürgen Hingsen (FRG)	8832	8-9 June	Mannheim, West Germany
Decathlon	Daley Thompson (GBR)	8847	8-9 August	Los Angeles, United States
Marathon	Steve Jones (GBR)	2:08:05	21 October	Chicago, United States

=== Women ===
EVENT	ATHLETE	MARK	DATE	VENUE
100 metres	Evelyn Ashford (USA)	10.76	22 August	Zürich
Mile	Natalya Artyomova (URS)	4:15.8	5 August	Leningrad
2000 metres	Tatyana Kazankina (URS)	5:28.72	4 August	Moscow
3,000 metres	Tatyana Kazankina (URS)	8:22.62	26 August	Leningrad
5,000 metres	Zola Pieterse (RSA)	15:01.83	5 January	Stellenbosch
5,000 metres	Ingrid Kristiansen (NOR)	14:58.89	28 June	Oslo
10,000 metres	Olga Bondarenko (URS)	31:13.78	24 June	Kiev
400m Hurdles	Margarita Ponomaryova (URS)	53.58	22 June	Kiev
4 × 400 m Relay	East Germany (GDR) • Gesine Walther • Sabine Busch • Dagmar Neubauer • Marita Koch	3:15.92	3 June	Erfurt
4 × 800 m Relay	Soviet Union (URS) • Nadiya Olizarenko • Lyubov Gurina • Lyudmila Borisova • Irina Podyalovskaya	7:50.17	5 August	Moscow
High Jump	Tamara Bykova (URS)	2.05m	22 June	Kiev
High Jump	Lyudmila Andonova (BUL)	2.07m	20 July	Berlin
Shot Put	Natalya Lisovskaya (URS)	22.53	27 May	Sochi
Discus Throw	Irina Meszynski (GDR)	73.36	18 August	Prague
Discus Throw	Zdenka Silhavá (TCH)	74.56	26 August	Nitra
Heptathlon	Sabine John (GDR)	6946	5-6 May	Potsdam
Half Marathon	Joan Benoit (USA)	1:08:34	16 September	Philadelphia

- Marita Koch (GDR) equals her own world record in the women's 200 metres held since 1979-06-10, clocking 21.71 seconds on 1984-07-21 at a meet in Potsdam.

== Men's Best Year Performers ==
=== 100 metres ===
Main race this year: Olympic Games 100 metres

RANK	ATHLETE	TIME	DATE	VENUE
1.	Mel Lattany (USA)	9.96	May 5	Athens, United States
2.	Carl Lewis (USA)	9.99	May 6	Houston, United States
3.	Marian Woronin (POL)	10.00	June 9	Warsaw, Poland
4.	Sam Graddy (USA)	10.09	May 12	Baton Rouge, United States
—	Harvey Glance (USA)	10.09	August 22	Zürich, Switzerland

=== 200 metres ===
Main race this year: Olympic Games 200 metres

RANK	ATHLETE	TIME	DATE	VENUE
1.	Carl Lewis (USA)	19.80	August 8	Los Angeles, United States
2.	Kirk Baptiste (USA)	19.96	August 8	Los Angeles, United States
3.	Albert Robinson (USA)	20.07	May 5	Indianapolis, United States
4	Pietro Mennea (ITA)	20.07	October 3	Brindisi, Italy
5.	Thomas Jefferson (USA)	20.26	August 8	Los Angeles, United States

=== 400 metres ===
Main race this year: Olympic Games 400 metres

RANK	ATHLETE	TIME	DATE	VENUE
1.	Alonzo Babers (USA)	44.27	August 8	Los Angeles, United States
2.	Gabriel Tiacoh (CIV)	44.54	August 8	Los Angeles, United States
3.	Antonio McKay (USA)	44.71	June 21	Los Angeles, United States
4.	Darren Clark (AUS)	44.75	August 8	Los Angeles, United States
—	Sunder Nix (USA)	44.75	August 8	Los Angeles, United States

=== 800 metres ===
Main race this year: Olympic Games 800 metres

RANK	ATHLETE	TIME	DATE	VENUE
1.	Joaquim Cruz (BRA)	1:41.77	August 26	Köln, West Germany
2.	Sammy Koskei (KEN)	1:42.28	August 26	Köln, West Germany
3.	Johnny Gray (USA)	1:42.96	August 29	Koblenz, West Germany
4.	Agberto Guimarães (BRA)	1:43.63	August 29	Koblenz, West Germany
5.	Sebastian Coe (GBR)	1:43.64	August 6	Los Angeles, United States

=== 1,500 metres ===
Main race this year: Olympic Games 1,500 metres

RANK	ATHLETE	TIME	DATE	VENUE
1.	Saïd Aouita (MAR)	3:31.54	July 6	Hengelo, Netherlands
2.	Sebastian Coe (GBR)	3:32.39	August 22	Zürich, Switzerland
3.	Steve Cram (GBR)	3:33.13	August 20	Budapest, Hungary
4.	Steve Scott (USA)	3:33.46	August 22	Zürich, Switzerland
5.	Pierre Délèze (SUI)	3:33.64	August 22	Zürich, Switzerland

=== 5,000 metres ===
Main race this year: Olympic Games 5,000 metres

RANK	ATHLETE	TIME	DATE	VENUE
1.	Saïd Aouita (MAR)	13:04.78	June 13	Florence, Italy
2.	Markus Ryffel (SUI)	13:07.54	August 11	Los Angeles, United States
3.	António Leitão (POR)	13:09.20	August 11	Los Angeles, United States
4.	Wodajo Bulti (ETH)	13:10.08	June 13	Florence, Italy
5.	Tim Hutchings (GBR)	13:11.50	August 11	Los Angeles, United States

=== 10,000 metres ===
Main race this year: Olympic Games 10,000 metres

RANK	ATHLETE	TIME	DATE	VENUE
1.	Fernando Mamede (POR)	27:13.81	July 2	Stockholm, Sweden
2.	Carlos Lopes (POR)	27:17.48	July 2	Stockholm, Sweden
3.	Hansjörg Kunze (GDR)	27:33.10	May 5	Potsdam, East Germany
4.	Mark Nenow (USA)	27:40.56	July 2	Stockholm, Sweden
5.	Martti Vainio (FIN)	27:41.75	June 13	Florence, Italy

=== Half Marathon ===
RANK	ATHLETE	TIME	DATE	VENUE
1.	Alberto Cova (ITA)	1:01:52	May 6	Milan, Italy

=== 110m Hurdles ===
Main race this year: Olympic Games 110m Hurdles

RANK	ATHLETE	TIME	DATE	VENUE
1.	Greg Foster (USA)	13.15	August 22	Zürich, Switzerland
2.	Roger Kingdom (USA)	13.16	August 22	Zürich, Switzerland
3.	Tony Campbell (USA)	13.23	May 13	Westwood, United States
4.	Mark McKoy (CAN)	13.27	July 25	Walnut, United States
5.	Arto Bryggare (FIN)	13.35	August 5	Los Angeles, United States

=== 400m Hurdles ===
Main race this year: Olympic Games 400m Hurdles

RANK	ATHLETE	TIME	DATE	VENUE
1.	Edwin Moses (USA)	47.32	August 29	Koblenz, West Germany
2.	Harald Schmid (FRG)	47.69	July 10	Lausanne, Switzerland
3.	Danny Harris (USA)	48.02	June 17	Los Angeles, United States
4.	Tony Rambo (USA)	48.16	June 17	Los Angeles, United States
5.	Tranel Hawkins (USA)	48.28	June 18	Los Angeles, United States

=== 3,000m Steeplechase ===
Main race this year: Olympic Games 3,000m Steeplechase

RANK	ATHLETE	TIME	DATE	VENUE
1.	Joseph Mahmoud (FRA)	8:07.62	August 24	Brussels, Belgium
2.	Bogusław Mamiński (POL)	8:09.18	August 24	Brussels, Belgium
3.	Julius Korir (KEN)	8:11.80	August 10	Los Angeles, United States
4.	Brian Diemer (USA)	8:13.16	August 29	Koblenz, West Germany
5.	Colin Reitz (GBR)	8:13.78	July 21	Oslo, Norway

=== High Jump ===
Main competition this year: Olympic Games High Jump

RANK	ATHLETE	HEIGHT	DATE	VENUE
1.	Zhu Jianhua (CHN)	2.39	June 10	Eberstadt, West Germany
2.	Carlo Thränhardt (FRG)	2.37	February 24	West Berlin, West Germany
2.	Valeriy Sereda (URS)	2.37	September 2	Rieti, Italy
4.	Igor Paklin (URS)	2.36	February 1	Milan, Italy
4.	Sergey Zasimovich (URS)	2.36	May 5	Tashkent, Soviet Union
4.	Dietmar Mögenburg (FRG)	2.36	June 10	Eberstadt, West Germany

=== Long Jump ===
Main competition this year: Olympic Games Long Jump

RANK	ATHLETE	DISTANCE	DATE	VENUE
1.	Carl Lewis (USA)	8.79	January 27	New York, United States
2.	Larry Myricks (USA)	8.59	September 5	Rhede, United States
3.	Lutz Dombrowski (GDR)	8.50	July 27	Dresden, East Germany
4.	Konstantin Semykin (URS)	8.38	August 17	Moscow, Soviet Union
5.	Jaime Jefferson (CUB)	8.37	August 17	Moscow, Soviet Union

=== Triple Jump ===
Main competition this year: Olympic Games Triple Jump

RANK	ATHLETE	DISTANCE	DATE	VENUE
1.	Oleg Protsenko (URS)	17.52	June 21	Kiev, Soviet Union
2.	Aleksandr Yakovlyev (URS)	17.50	June 10	Sochi, Soviet Union
2.	Mike Conley (USA)	17.50	June 17	Los Angeles, United States
4.	Gennadiy Valyukevich (URS)	17.47	July 19	Moscow, Soviet Union
5.	Lázaro Betancourt (CUB)	17.45	August 26	Cologne, West Germany

=== Discus ===
Main competition this year: Olympic Games Discus Throw

RANK	ATHLETE	DISTANCE	DATE	VENUE
1.	John Powell (USA)	71.26	June 9	San José, United States
1.	Ricky Bruch (SWE)	71.26	November 15	Malmö, Sweden
3.	Art Burns (USA)	70.98	July 21	Eugene, United States
4.	Mac Wilkins (USA)	70.44	June 9	San José, United States
5.	Imrich Bugár (TCH)	70.26	September 8	Cagliari, Italy

=== Hammer ===
RANK	ATHLETE	DISTANCE	DATE	VENUE
1.	Yuriy Syedikh (URS)	86.34	July 3	Cork City, Ireland
2.	Sergey Litvinov (URS)	85.20	July 3	Cork City, Ireland
3.	Jüri Tamm (URS)	84.40	September 9	Banská Bystrica, Slovakia
4.	Igor Nikulin (URS)	82.56	August 17	Moscow, Soviet Union
5.	Juha Tiainen (FIN)	81.52	June 11	Tampere, Finland

=== Shot Put ===
Main competition this year: Olympic Games Shot Put

RANK	ATHLETE	DISTANCE	DATE	VENUE
1.	Brian Oldfield (USA)	22.19	May 26	San José, United States
2.	Sergey Kasnauskas (URS)	22.09	August 23	Stayki, Soviet Union
3.	Udo Beyer (GDR)	22.04	June 11	Rehlingen, United States
4.	John Brenner (USA)	21.92	June 2	Eugene, United States
5.	Michael Carter (USA)	21.76	June 2	Eugene, United States

=== Javelin ===
Main competition this year: Olympic Games Javelin Throw

RANK	ATHLETE	DISTANCE	DATE	VENUE
1.	Uwe Hohn (GDR)	104.80	July 20	East Berlin, East Germany
2.	Detlef Michel (GDR)	93.68	June 2	Erfurt, East Germany
3.	Duncan Atwood (USA)	93.44	June 18	Los Angeles, United States
4.	Raimo Manninen (FIN)	93.42	July 1	Pihtipudas, Finland
5.	Einar Vilhjálmsson (ISL)	92.42	April 6	Austin, United States

=== Pole Vault ===
Main competition this year: Olympic Games Pole Vault

RANK	ATHLETE	HEIGHT	DATE	VENUE
1.	Sergey Bubka (URS)	5.94	August 31	Rome, Italy
2.	Thierry Vigneron (FRA)	5.91	August 31	Rome, Italy
3.	Konstantin Volkov (URS)	5.85	June 22	Kiev, Soviet Union
4.	Mike Tully (USA)	5.82	July 21	Eugene, United States
4.	Aleksandr Krupskiy (URS)	5.82	August 20	Budapest, Hungary

=== Decathlon ===
Main competition this year: Olympic Games Decathlon

RANK	ATHLETE	POINTS	DATE	VENUE
1.	Jürgen Hingsen (FRG)	8798	June 9	Mannheim, West Germany
1.	Daley Thompson (GBR)	8798	August 9	Los Angeles, United States
3.	Uwe Freimuth (GDR)	8704	July 21	Potsdam, East Germany
4.	Grigoriy Degtyaryev (URS)	8652	June 22	Moscow, Soviet Union
5.	Aleksandr Apaychev (URS)	8642	June 3	Neubrandenburg, DDR

== Women's Best Year Performers ==
=== 100 metres ===
Main race this year: Olympic Games 100 metres

RANK	1984 WORLD BEST PERFORMERS	TIME
1.	Evelyn Ashford (USA)	10.76
2.	Marlies Göhr (GDR)	10.84
3.	Florence Griffith (USA)	10.99
4.	Merlene Ottey-Page (JAM)	11.01
5.	Lyudmila Kondratyeva (URS)	11.02

=== 200 metres ===
Main race this year: Olympic Games 200 metres

RANK	1984 WORLD BEST PERFORMERS	TIME
1.	Marita Koch (GDR)	21.71
2.	Marlies Göhr (GDR)	21.74
3.	Valerie Brisco (USA)	21.81
4.	Bärbel Wöckel (GDR)	21.85
5.	Florence Griffith (USA)	22.04

=== 400 metres ===
Main race this year: Olympic Games 400 metres

RANK	1984 WORLD BEST PERFORMERS	TIME
1.	Marita Koch (GDR)	48.16
2.	Tatána Kocembová (TCH)	48.73
3.	Valerie Brisco (USA)	48.83
4.	Olga Vladykina (URS)	48.98
5.	Jarmila Kratochvílová (TCH)	49.02

=== 800 metres ===
Main race this year: Olympic Games 800 metres

RANK	1984 WORLD BEST PERFORMERS	TIME
1.	Irina Podyalovskaya (URS)	1:55.69
2.	Nadiya Olizarenko (URS)	1:56.09
3.	Lyubov Gurina (URS)	1:56.26
4.	Doina Melinte (ROU)	1:56.53
5.	Lyudmila Borisova (URS)	1:56.78

=== 1,500 metres ===
Main race this year: Olympic Games 1,500 metres

RANK	1984 WORLD BEST PERFORMERS	TIME
1.	Nadezhda Ralldugina (URS)	3:56.63
2.	Yekaterina Podkopayeva (URS)	3:56.65
3.	Maricica Puică (ROU)	3:57.22
4.	Tatyana Pozdnyakova (URS)	3:57.70
5.	Galina Zakharova (URS)	3:57.72

=== Mile ===
RANK	1984 WORLD BEST PERFORMERS	TIME
1.	Natalya Artyomova (URS)	4:15.8
2.	Ruth Wysocki (USA)	4:21.78
3.	Christina Boxer (GBR)	4:22.64
4.	Mary Decker (USA)	4:22.92
5.	Christine Benning (GBR)	4:24.57

=== 3,000 metres ===
Main race this year: Olympic Games 3,000 metres

RANK	1984 WORLD BEST PERFORMERS	TIME
1.	Tatyana Kazankina (URS)	8:22.62
2.	Svetlana Guskova (URS)	8:29.59
3.	Tatyana Pozdnyakova (URS)	8:32.0
4.	Maricica Puică (ROU)	8:33.57
5.	Mary Decker (USA)	8:34.91

=== 5,000 metres ===
RANK	1984 WORLD BEST PERFORMERS	TIME
1.	Ingrid Kristiansen (NOR)	14:58.89
2.	Zola Budd (RSA)	15:01.83
3.	Aurora Cunha (POR)	15:09.07
4.	Angela Tooby (GBR)	15:22.50
5.	Brenda Webb (USA)	15:22.76

=== 10,000 metres ===
RANK	1984 WORLD BEST PERFORMERS	TIME
1.	Olga Bondarenko (URS)	31:13.78
2.	Galina Zakharova (URS)	31:15.00
3.	Zhanna Tursunova (URS)	31:53.53
4.	Lyubov Konyukhova (URS)	31:56.01
5.	Anna Domoradskaya (URS)	31:56.02

=== Half Marathon ===
RANK	1984 WORLD BEST PERFORMERS	TIME
1.	Joan Benoit (USA)	1:08:34

=== 100m Hurdles ===
Main race this year: Olympic Games 100m Hurdles

RANK	1984 WORLD BEST PERFORMERS	TIME
1.	Lucyna Kalek (POL)	12.43
2.	Vera Akimova (URS)	12.50
2.	Yordanka Donkova (BUL)	12.50
4.	Bettine Jahn (GDR)	12.53
5.	Sabine Paetz (GDR)	12.54

=== 400m Hurdles ===
Main race this year: Olympic Games 400m Hurdles

RANK	1984 WORLD BEST PERFORMERS	TIME
1.	Margarita Ponomaryova (URS)	53.58
2.	Marina Styepanova (URS)	53.67
3.	Yekaterina Fesenko (URS)	54.34
4.	Tatyana Pavlova (URS)	54.43
5.	Yelena Filipishina (URS)	54.56

=== High Jump ===
Main competition this year: Olympic Games High Jump

RANK	1984 WORLD BEST PERFORMERS	HEIGHT
1.	Lyudmila Andonova (BUL)	2.07
2.	Tamara Bykova (URS)	2.05
3.	Ulrike Meyfarth (FRG)	2.02
4.	Sara Simeoni (ITA)	2.00
4.	Stefka Kostadinova (BUL)	2.00

=== Long Jump ===
Main competition this year: Olympic Games Long Jump

RANK	1984 WORLD BEST PERFORMERS	DISTANCE
1.	Heike Drechsler (GDR)	7.40
2.	Galina Chistyakova (URS)	7.29
3.	Anişoara Cuşmir (ROU)	7.27
4.	Helga Radtke (GDR)	7.21
5.	Sabine Paetz (GDR)	7.12

=== Discus ===
Main competition this year: Olympic Games Discus Throw

RANK	1984 WORLD BEST PERFORMERS	DISTANCE
1.	Zdeňka Šilhavá (TCH)	74.56
2.	Irina Meszynski (GDR)	73.36
3.	Galina Savinkova (URS)	73.28
4.	Gisela Beyer (GDR)	73.10
5.	Martina Hellmann (GDR)	72.32

=== Shot Put ===
Main competition this year: Olympic Games Shot Put

RANK	1984 WORLD BEST PERFORMERS	DISTANCE
1.	Natalya Lisovskaya (URS)	22.53
2.	Ilona Slupianek (GDR)	21.85
3.	Helena Fibingerová (TCH)	21.60
4.	Nunu Abashidze (URS)	21.53
5.	Ines Müller (GDR)	21.32

=== Javelin (old design) ===
Main competition this year: Olympic Games Javelin Throw

RANK	1984 WORLD BEST PERFORMERS	DISTANCE
1.	Petra Felke (GDR)	74.72
2.	Tiina Lillak (FIN)	74.24
3.	Anna Verouli (GRE)	72.70
4.	Antje Zöllkau (GDR)	72.16
5.	Fatima Whitbread (GBR)	71.68

=== Heptathlon ===
Main competition this year: Olympic Games Heptathlon

RANK	1984 WORLD BEST PERFORMERS	POINTS
1.	Sabine Paetz (GDR)	6946
2.	Natalya Shubenkova (URS)	6859
3.	Jane Frederick (USA)	6803
4.	Ramona Neubert (GDR)	6789
5.	Anke Vater (GDR)	6775

== Marathon ==
=== Year Rankings ===
==== Men ====
RANK	ATHLETE	TIME	DATE	VENUE
1.	Stephen Jones (GBR)	2:08:05 WR	October 21	Chicago, United States
2.	Carlos Lopes (POR)	2:09:06	October 21	Chicago, United States
3.	Robert de Castella (AUS)	2:09:09	October 21	Chicago, United States
4.	Jörg Peter (GDR)	2:09:14	July 21	East Berlin, East Germany
5.	Carlos Lopes (POR)	2:09:21	August 12	Los Angeles, United States
6.	Michael Heilmann (GDR)	2:09:30	July 21	East Berlin, East Germany
7.	Ernest Seleke (RSA)	2:09:41	March 31	Port Elizabeth, South Africa
8.	John Treacy (IRL)	2:09:56	August 12	Los Angeles, United States
9.	Charlie Spedding (GBR)	2:09:57	May 13	London, United Kingdom
10.	Charlie Spedding (GBR)	2:09:58	August 12	Los Angeles, United States

==== Women ====
RANK	ATHLETE	TIME	DATE	VENUE
1.	Ingrid Kristiansen (NOR)	2:24:26 WR	May 13	London, United Kingdom
2.	Joan Benoit (USA)	2:24:52	August 5	Los Angeles, United States
3.	Rosa Mota (POR)	2:26:01	October 21	Chicago, United States
4.	Grete Waitz (NOR)	2:26:18	August 5	Los Angeles, United States
5.	Katrin Dörre (GDR)	2:26:52	July 21	East Berlin, East Germany
6.	Rosa Mota (POR)	2:26:57	August 5	Los Angeles, United States
7.	Ingrid Kristiansen (NOR)	2:27:34	August 5	Los Angeles, United States
8.	Lisa Martin (AUS)	2:27:40	October 21	Chicago, United States
9.	Ingrid Kristiansen (NOR)	2:27:51	January 15	Houston, United States
10.	Lorraine Moller (NZL)	2:28:34	August 5	Los Angeles, United States

=== International Races ===
DATE	MARATHON	NATION	MEN'S WINNER	TIME	WOMEN'S WINNER	TIME
February 19	Los Angeles Marathon	United States	(Tanzania) Gidamis Shahanga	2:10:19	(Canada) Jacqueline Gareau	2:31:57
April 14	Rotterdam Marathon	Netherlands	(Tanzania) Gidamis Shahanga	2:11:12	(Netherlands) Carla Beurskens	2:34:56
April 16	Boston Marathon	United States	(England) Geoff Smith	2:10:34	(New Zealand) Lorraine Moller	2:29:28
May 12	Amsterdam Marathon	Netherlands	(Netherlands) Gerard Nijboer	2:14:28	(Netherlands) Eefje van Wissen	2:43:51
May 12	Paris Marathon	France	(Djibouti) Hussein Ahmed Salah	2:11:58	(France) Sylviane Geffray	2:38:20
May 13	London Marathon	United Kingdom	(England) Charlie Spedding	2:09:57	(Norway) Ingrid Kristiansen	2:24:26
August 5	Olympic Marathon	United States	—	—	(United States) Joan Benoit	2:24:52
August 12	Olympic Marathon	United States	(Portugal) Carlos Lopes	2:09:58	—	—
September 30	Berlin Marathon	West Germany	(Denmark) John Skovbjerg	2:13:35	(Hungary) Agnes Jakab	2:39:32
October 21	Chicago Marathon	United States	(Wales) Stephen Jones	2:08:05	(Portugal) Rosa Mota	2:26:01
December 2	Fukuoka Marathon	Japan	(Japan) Takeyuki Nakayama	2:10:00	—	—

== Births ==
=== January ===
- January 9 — Firehiwot Dado, Ethiopian long-distance runner
- January 10 — Solomon Busendich, Kenyan long-distance runner
- January 14 — Teemu Wirkkala, Finnish javelin thrower
- January 16 — Yuki Yamazaki, Japanese race walker
- January 19 — Jarkko Kinnunen, Finnish race walker
- January 20 — Andriy Yurin, Ukrainian race walker

=== February ===
- February 13 — Eric Matthias, British Virgin Islands discus thrower
- February 20 — Zhu Xiaolin, Chinese long-distance runner
- February 22 — Yuki Yamaguchi, Japanese sprinter
- February 25 — Xing Huina, Chinese athlete

=== March ===
- March 24 — Lucy Kabuu, Kenyan long distance runner
- March 24 — Jacopo Marin, Italian sprinter
- March 27 — Roman Valiyev, Kazakhstani triple jumper
- March 31 — Anna Pierce, American middle distance runner

=== April ===
- April 2 — Germán Lauro, Argentine shot putter
- April 17 — Pavel Kryvitski, Belarusian hammer thrower
- April 19 — Martin Marić, Croatian discus thrower
- April 26 — Petrina Price, Australian high jumper
- April 30 — Yevhen Vynohradov, Ukrainian hammer thrower

=== May ===
- May 1 — Louis Tristán, Peruvian long jumper
- May 8 — Andreas Mokdasi, Swedish sprinter
- May 10 — Alana Boyd, Australian pole vaulter

=== June ===
- June 17 — Michael Mathieu, Bahamian sprinter
- June 30 — Gretchen Quintana, Cuban heptathlete

=== July ===
- July 7 — Inna Poluškina, Latvian long-distance runner
- July 8 — Mariem Alaoui Selsouli, Moroccan middle/long-distance runner
- July 9 — Olusoji Fasuba, Nigerian sprinter
- July 22 — He Dan, Chinese race walker
- July 25 — Javier Culson, Puerto Rican hurdler
- July 26 — Kyriakos Ioannou, Cypriot high jumper

=== August ===
- August 4 — Xing Shucai, Chinese race walker

=== September ===
- September 3 — David Fiegen, Luxembourgian middle distance runner
- September 9 — Andrey Silnov, Russian high jumper
- September 10 — Ismail Ahmed Ismail, Sudanese runner
- September 26 — Michael Letterlough, Caymanian hammer thrower

=== October ===
- October 6 — Adina Anton, Romanian long jumper
- October 14 — Svetlana Bolshakova, Russian-born Belgian triple jumper
- October 24 — Christian Reif, German long jumper.
- October 24 — Sultana Frizell, Canadian hammer thrower
- October 28 — Anyika Onuora, British sprinter

=== November ===
- November 10 — Andrej Poljanec, Slovenian pole vaulter
- November 12 — Siraj Gena, Ethiopian long-distance runner

=== December ===
- December 15 — Véronique Mang, Cameroon-born French athlete
- December 26 — Alex Schwazer, Italian race walker
- December 28 — Kimberley Mickle, Australian javelin thrower
- December 31 — Mohamed Faraj Al-Kaabi, Qatari hammer thrower

== Deaths ==
- January 10 — Toivo Loukola (81), Finnish athlete (b. 1902)
- March 15 — Ken Carpenter (70), American discus thrower (b. 1913)
- June 1 — Sten Pettersson (81), Swedish hurdler (b. 1902)
