= Athletics at the 1988 Summer Olympics – Women's heptathlon =

Women's heptathlon at the Games of the XXIV Olympiad
- Pictogram of athletics
- Venues: Olympic Stadium
- Dates: September 23–24
- Competitors: 30 from 19 nations
- Winning result: 7291 WR

Medalists
1st place, gold medalist(s)		Jackie Joyner-Kersee; United States
2nd place, silver medalist(s)		Sabine John; East Germany
3rd place, bronze medalist(s)		Anke Behmer; East Germany

These are the official results of the Women's Heptathlon competition at the 1988 Summer Olympics in Seoul, South Korea. There were a total number of 32 entrants, with three non-starters. The competition was held on September 23, 1988, and September 24, 1988.

== Records ==
These were the standing World and Olympic records (in points) before the 1988 Summer Olympics.

World record	7215	(United States) Jackie Joyner-Kersee	Indianapolis (USA)	July 16, 1988
Olympic record	6390	(Australia) Glynis Nunn	Los Angeles (USA)	August 4, 1984

The following World and Olympic record was set during this competition.

Date	Event	Athlete	Points	OR	WR
September 24, 1988	Final	Jackie Joyner-Kersee (USA)	7291	OR	WR

== Summary ==
Coming in to the Olympics, Jackie Joyner-Kersee stood well ahead of the world. As a 26 year old, she was at the peak of her career and the returning silver medalist had steadily improved since the first Olympic heptathlon. In the previous two years, she had amassed the top five marks in history, including the world record of 7215, set at the Olympic Trials. Along the way, she also tied Heike Drechsler for the world record in the long jump. She was famously coached by her husband Bob Kersee, who also coached her sister in law Florence Griffith Joyner to the astounding 10.49 world record in the 100 metres at those same trials. #2 in history Sabine John was also in this competition, but her personal best was more than 200 points behind Joyner-Kersee. Her GDR teammate Anke Behmer was the #5 performer in history and almost another 200 points behind John. Soviet Natalya Shubenkova was the #4 performer in history.

Running head to head against her chief rivals, JJK recorded an Olympic heptathlon best 12.69 in the third heat of the first event, the 100 metres hurdles. John's 12.85 still left her 25 points behind. In the high jump JJK jumped clean through 1.83, which is where Behmer topped out and John could not clear, then she made 1.86 on her second attempt to tie three others for the event lead. After 2 events, JJK already had over a hundred-point lead. The competition appeared settled, the world record was clearly her target as her husband/coach reinforced with every instruction from the stands. In John's best event, the shot put, her 16.23m did gain 28 points on Joyner-Kersee's second place 15.80m lifetime personal best, nobody else was less than a metre behind John. Concluding the first day, Joyner-Kersee's Olympic heptathlon best 22.56 left Behmer in second place, more than a half second behind.

JJK started the second day with a 7.27 m (23 ft 10 in) long jump. Not only was it the Olympic heptathlon best, it was the Olympic record for the long jump. To date it remains the World heptathlon best. John, in second place, was more than a half metre behind and she was 181 points behind in the competition. The sixth event, the javelin, was the first event Joyner-Kersee didn't dominate, with her 45.66m, she was only fourth best. But among the leaders, Shubenkova was the only one to gain points. Joyner-Kersee would enter the final event, the 800 metres, with a 429-point lead. But before that she needed to take another excursion across the stadium to compete in the qualifying round of the long jump. Her 6.96m first attempt surpassed the automatic qualifier. It would take a 2:13.6 to equal the world record, a time that was within Joyner-Kersee's range, she had run a half a second faster in the 1984 Olympics. And with the huge lead, she would virtually have to collapse to fail to win the gold. Going for the world record, Joyner-Kersee keyed off of the three East German athletes, all with superior 800 metre credentials to hers. When the three surged on the final backstretch, to break away from Shubenkova, Joyner-Kersee went with them. Behmer sprinted the final straightaway to take a 2:04.20 event victory while JJK struggled the last 100 metres, getting caught by Shubenkova before the line. While 4 of her top 5 pursuers took back points in the 800, she put another 76 points onto the world record. Her final score, 7291. To date, no other athlete has exceeded 7032, that by Carolina Klüft in the 2007 World Championships. Joyner-Kersee would win the long jump the following day, with the still standing Olympic Record of 7.40 m (24 ft 3 1/4 in), beating her day-old record. And she would defend the heptathlon title in 1992. John scored 6897 to take silver, her lifetime personal best. Behmer also scored her personal best 6858 to take the bronze medal.

== Final ==
The highest mark recorded in each event is highlighted in yellow

Rank	Athlete	Nationality	100m H	HJ	SP	200m	LJ	JT	800m	Points	Notes
1st place, gold medalist(s)	Jackie Joyner-Kersee	United States	12.69	1.86	15.80	22.56	7.27	45.66	2:08.51	7291	WR
2nd place, silver medalist(s)	Sabine John	East Germany	12.85	1.80	16.23	23.65	6.71	42.56	2:06.14	6897	
3rd place, bronze medalist(s)	Anke Behmer	East Germany	13.20	1.83	14.20	23.10	6.68	44.54	2:04.20	6858	
4	Natalya Shubenkova	Soviet Union	13.51	1.74	14.76	23.93	6.32	47.46	2:07.90	6540	
5	Remigija Sablovskaitė	Soviet Union	13.61	1.80	15.23	23.92	6.25	42.78	2:12.24	6456	
6	Ines Schulz	East Germany	13.75	1.83	13.50	24.65	6.33	42.82	2:05.79	6456	
7	Jane Flemming	Australia	13.38	1.80	12.88	23.59	6.37	40.28	2:12.54	6351	
8	Cindy Greiner	United States	13.55	1.80	14.13	24.48	6.47	38.00	2:13.65	6297	
9	Zuzana Lajbnerová	Czechoslovakia	13.63	1.83	14.28	24.86	6.11	43.30	2:16.05	6252	
10	Svetlana Buraga	Soviet Union	13.25	1.77	12.62	23.59	6.28	39.06	2:14.74	6232	
11	Marjon Wijnsma	Netherlands	13.75	1.86	13.01	25.03	6.34	37.86	2:11.49	6205	
12	Svetla Dimitrova	Bulgaria	13.24	1.80	12.02	23.49	6.19	37.62	2:15.73	6171	
13	Corinne Schneider	Switzerland	13.85	1.86	11.58	24.87	6.05	47.50	2:14.93	6157	
14	Sabine Braun	West Germany	13.71	1.83	13.16	24.78	6.12	44.58	2:22.82	6109	
15	Satu Ruotsalainen	Finland	13.79	1.80	12.32	24.61	6.08	45.44	2:17.06	6101	
16	Dong Yuping	China	13.93	1.86	14.21	25.00	6.40	38.60	2:26.67	6087	
17	Kim Hagger	Great Britain	13.47	1.80	12.75	25.47	6.34	35.78	2:18.48	5975	
18	Wendy Brown	United States	14.07	1.83	12.69	24.83	6.13	44.34	2:26.43	5972	
19	Joanne Mulliner	Great Britain	14.39	1.71	12.68	24.92	6.10	37.76	2:18.02	5746	
20	Jacqueline Hautenauve	Belgium	14.04	1.77	11.81	25.61	5.99	35.68	2:13.90	5734	
21	Ragne Kytölä	Finland	14.31	1.77	11.66	25.69	5.75	39.48	2:13.35	5686	
22	Conceição Geremias	Brazil	14.23	1.71	12.95	25.50	5.50	39.64	2:24.02	5508	
23	Hsu Huei-ying	Chinese Taipei	14.85	1.68	10.00	25.23	5.47	39.14	2:17.30	5290	
24	Ji Jeong-mi	South Korea	14.53	1.71	10.83	26.61	5.50	39.26	2:19.17	5289	
25	Iamo Launa	Papua New Guinea	16.42	1.50	11.78	26.16	4.88	46.38	2:43.43	4566	
	Sainiana Tukana	Fiji	15.60	NM	8.61	26.37	5.12	DNS	–	DNF	
	Sabine Everts	West Germany	13.74	1.71	11.54	DNS	–	–	–	DNF	
	Chantal Beaugeant	France	13.78	1.80	12.79	DNS	–	–	–	DNF	
	Judy Simpson	Great Britain	13.71	1.77	DNS	–	–	–	–	DNF	
	Yasmina Azzizi	Algeria	DNS	–	–	–	–	–	–	DNS	
	Yvonne Hasler	Liechtenstein	DNS	–	–	–	–	–	–	DNS	
	Tineke Hidding	Netherlands	DNS	–	–	–	–	–	–	DNS	

== See also ==
- 1984 Women's Olympic Heptathlon (Los Angeles)
- 1986 Women's European Championship Heptathlon (Stuttgart)
- 1987 Women's World Championship Heptathlon (Rome)
- 1988 Hypo-Meeting
- 1990 Women's European Championship Heptathlon (Split)
- 1991 Women's World Championship Heptathlon (Tokyo)
- 1992 Women's Olympic Heptathlon (Barcelona)
