= Athletics at the 1980 Summer Olympics – Women's pentathlon =

Women's pentathlon at the Games of the XXII Olympiad
- Venue: Lenin Central Stadium
- Date: 24 July
- Competitors: 19 from 10 nations
- Winning result: 5083 WR

Medalists
1st place, gold medalist(s)		Nadiya Tkachenko; Soviet Union
2nd place, silver medalist(s)		Olga Rukavishnikova; Soviet Union
3rd place, bronze medalist(s)		Olga Kuragina; Soviet Union

These are the official results of the Women's Pentathlon competition at the 1980 Summer Olympics in Moscow, USSR. There were a total number of 19 participating athletes, with the competition held on 24 July 1980. This was to be the last Pentathlon competition at this level as the Heptathlon subsequently replaced it in 1984 and became the multi-event competition for women.

== Results ==
The highest mark recorded in each event is highlighted in yellow

Rank	Athlete	Nationality	100m H	SP	HJ	LJ	800m	Points	Notes
1st place, gold medalist(s)	Nadiya Tkachenko	Soviet Union	13.29	16.84	1.84	6.73	2:05.2	5083	WR
2nd place, silver medalist(s)	Olga Rukavishnikova	Soviet Union	13.66	14.09	1.88	6.79	2:04.8	4937	
3rd place, bronze medalist(s)	Olga Kuragina	Soviet Union	13.26	12.49	1.84	6.77	2:03.6	4875	
4	Ramona Neubert	East Germany	13.93	13.68	1.77	6.63	2:07.7	4698	
5	Margit Papp	Hungary	13.96	14.94	1.74	6.35	2:15.8	4562	
6	Burglinde Pollak	East Germany	13.74	16.67	1.68	5.93	2:14.4	4553	
7	Valentina Dimitrova	Bulgaria	14.39	15.65	1.74	5.91	2:15.5	4458	
8	Emiliya Kunova	Bulgaria	13.73	11.98	1.74	6.10	2:11.1	4431	
9	Florence Picaut	France	13.75	13.24	1.80	5.83	2:16.7	4424	
10	Sylvia Barlag	Netherlands	14.20	11.82	1.80	6.05	2:16.4	4333	
11	Marcela Koblasová	Czechoslovakia	14.10	13.42	1.71	6.15	2:20.3	4328	
12	Małgorzata Guzowska	Poland	14.16	13.63	1.80	6.21	2:29.3	4326	
13	Judy Livermore	Great Britain	13.57	13.56	1.77	5.71	2:25.3	4304	
14	Conceição Geremias	Brazil	14.33	13.16	1.71	5.97	2:18.9	4263	
15	Sue Longden	Great Britain	14.10	11.47	1.74	6.09	2:19.6	4234	
16	Yvette Wray	Great Britain	13.78	12.01	1.65	5.60	2:15.9	4159	
17	Cécile Ngambi	Cameroon	14.09	10.28	1.80	5.38	2:39.7	3832	
	Nancy Vallecilla	Ecuador	14.46	11.12	1.68	5.45	DNS	DNF	
	Christine Laser	East Germany	13.67	13.39	NM	DNS	–	DNF	

== See also ==
- 1976 Women's Olympic Games Pentathlon (Montreal)
- 1978 Women's European Championships Pentathlon (Prague)
- 1982 Women's European Championships Heptathlon (Athens)
- 1983 Women's World Championship Heptathlon (Helsinki)
- 1984 Women's Olympic Games Heptathlon (Los Angeles)
- 1984 Women's Friendship Games Heptathlon (Prague)
