= Heike Tischler =

German heptathlete

Medal record

Women's athletics

Representing East Germany

European Championships
Silver medal – second place	1990 Split	Heptathlon

Heike Tischler (born 4 February 1964 in Saalfeld, Thuringia) is a retired German heptathlete.

She won the silver medal for East Germany at the 1990 European Championships in Athletics in Split with a personal best score of 6572 points. This ranks her eighth among German heptathletes, behind Sabine Braun, Sabine Paetz, Ramona Neubert, Anke Behmer-Vater, Heike Drechsler, Ines Schulz and Sibylle Thiele. At that point, East Germany was already scheduled for reunification with West Germany as modern Germany and so this was this the last championship with separate East and West German teams. She entered the 1991 World Championships (competing for reunified Germany), but did not finish the competition.

Her daughter Sophie Weißenberg also competes in the heptathlon.

== European Championships in Athletics ==
- 1990 European Championships in Athletics in Split (Yugoslavia)
  - Silver Silver medal in heptathlon
