= Athletics at the Friendship Games – Women's heptathlon =

The women's heptathlon event at the Friendship Games was held on 16 and 17 August 1984 at the Evžen Rošický Stadium in Prague, Czechoslovakia.

== Results ==
The highest mark recorded in each event is highlighted in yellow

| Rank | Athlete | Nationality | 100m H | HJ | SP | 200m | LJ | JT | 800m | Points | Notes |
|---|---|---|---|---|---|---|---|---|---|---|---|
| 1st place, gold medalist(s) | Natalya Gracheva | Soviet Union | 13.61 | 1.76 | 15.31 | 24.13 | 6.77 | 35.84 | 2:07.55 | 6377 | |
| 2nd place, silver medalist(s) | Nadezhda Vinogradova | Soviet Union | 14.14 | 1.70 | 14.36 | 23.94 | 6.59 | 43.72 | 2:10.70 | 6357 | |
| 3rd place, bronze medalist(s) | Heike Tischler | East Germany | 14.36 | 1.79 | 13.30 | 24.35 | 6.16 | 47.56 | 2:10.02 | 6290 | |
| 4 | Małgorzata Nowak | Poland | 13.69 | 1.82 | 14.66 | 24.91 | 6.09 | 42.32 | 2:20.70 | 6194 | |
| 5 | Marcela Koblasová | Czechoslovakia | 14.09 | 1.73 | 14.92 | 25.13 | 6.21 | 39.76 | 2:20.69 | 6039 | |
| 6 | Helena Otahalová | Czechoslovakia | 13.74 | 1.76 | 12.97 | 24.93 | 5.91 | 42.76 | 2:21.66 | 5987 | |
| 7 | Hildelisa Despaigne | Cuba | 14.21 | 1.82 | 12.02 | 25.44 | 6.36 | 40.04 | 2:18.86 | 5973 | |
| 8 | Zuzana Lajbnerová | Czechoslovakia | 14.79 | 1.79 | 14.67 | 26.64 | 5.99 | 44.80 | 2:21.46 | 5895 | |
| 9 | Emilia Pencheva | Bulgaria | 14.62 | 1.70 | 11.86 | 25.52 | 5.98 | 39.64 | 2:17.84 | 5718 | |
| | Natalya Shubenkova | Soviet Union | 13.89 | 1.73 | 13.85 | 25.33 | NM | 36.02 | DNS | DNF | |

== See also ==
- Athletics at the 1984 Summer Olympics – Women's heptathlon
