= Tånnander =

Tånnander is a Swedish surname. Notable people with the surname include:

- Annette Tånnander (born 1958), Swedish heptathlete, daughter of Kjell
- Jakob Tånnander (born 2000), Swedish footballer
- Kjell Tånnander (born 1927), Swedish decathlete, father of Annette and Kristine
- Kristine Tånnander (born 1955), Swedish heptathlete, daughter of Kjell
