= 1990 European Athletics Championships – Women's heptathlon =

Women's heptathlon at the European Athletics Championships

These are the official results of the Women's Heptathlon competition at the 1990 European Championships in Split, Yugoslavia. The competition was held at Stadion Poljud on 30 August and 31 August 1990.

== Medalists ==
| Gold | Sabine Braun; West Germany (FRG) |
| Silver | Heike Tischler; East Germany (GDR) |
| Bronze | Peggy Beer; East Germany (GDR) |

== Results ==
=== Final ===
30/31 August

The highest mark recorded in each event is highlighted in yellow

| Rank | Name | Nationality | 100m H | HJ | SP | 200m | LJ | JT | 800m | Points | Notes |
|---|---|---|---|---|---|---|---|---|---|---|---|
| 1st place, gold medalist(s) | Sabine Braun | West Germany | 13.55 (w: -0.2 m/s) | 1.91 | 14.46 | 24.61 (w: 0.9 m/s) | 6.38 (w: 1.0 m/s) | 53.06 | 2:15.20 | 6688 | |
| 2nd place, silver medalist(s) | Heike Tischler | East Germany | 14.08 (w: -0.9 m/s) | 1.82 | 13.73 | 24.29 (w: 0.9 m/s) | 6.22 (w: -0.7 m/s) | 53.24 | 2:05.50 | 6572 | |
| 3rd place, bronze medalist(s) | Peggy Beer | East Germany | 13.27 (w: -0.2 m/s) | 1.82 | 13.46 | 23.99 (w: 0.4 m/s) | 6.38 (w: 0.9 m/s) | 42.10 | 2:05.79 | 6531 | |
| 4 | Irina Belova | Soviet Union | 13.66 (w: -0.8 m/s) | 1.85 | 12.77 | 23.73 (w: 0.9 m/s) | 6.41 (w: 0.4 m/s) | 40.82 | 2:02.75 | 6521 | |
| 5 | Christiane Scharf | West Germany | 13.53 (w: -0.2 m/s) | 1.85 | 12.89 | 24.71 (w: 0.4 m/s) | 6.31 (w: 1.1 m/s) | 44.60 | 2:09.86 | 6390 | |
| 6 | Remigija Nazarovienė | Soviet Union | 13.48 (w: -0.2 m/s) | 1.82 | 13.72 | 24.32 (w: 0.9 m/s) | 6.05 (w: 0.5 m/s) | 46.40 | 2:11.41 | 6380 | |
| 7 | Birgit Clarius | West Germany | 14.08 (w: -0.9 m/s) | 1.79 | 14.58 | 24.72 (w: 0.4 m/s) | 6.05 (w: 0.4 m/s) | 48.96 | 2:09.32 | 6359 | |
| 8 | Petra Văideanu | Romania | 13.90 (w: -0.8 m/s) | 1.79 | 14.52 | 24.90 (w: 0.4 m/s) | 6.11 (w: 0.2 m/s) | 45.06 | 2:12.22 | 6264 | |
| 9 | Birgit Gautzsch | East Germany | 13.44 | 1.76 | 13.85 | 23.72 (w: 0.9 m/s) | 6.03 (w: 0.5 m/s) | 42.36 | 2:14.22 | 6255 | |
| 10 | Rita Ináncsi | Hungary | 14.46 | 1.79 | 14.22 | 25.45 (w: 0.4 m/s) | 6.06 (w: 0.5 m/s) | 48.06 | 2:18.06 | 6076 | NJR |
| 11 | Anne Brit Skjæveland | Norway | 13.81 | 1.82 | 11.50 | 24.81 (w: 0.4 m/s) | 5.87 (w: 0.1 m/s) | 36.30 | 2:13.99 | 5853 | |
| 12 | Joanne Mulliner | United Kingdom | 14.18 | 1.76 | 13.19 | 24.99 (w: 0.4 m/s) | 6.01 (w: 0.6 m/s) | 35.74 | 2:14.39 | 5849 | |
| 13 | Manuela Marxer | Liechtenstein | 14.04 | 1.76 | 12.07 | 24.63 (w: 0.4 m/s) | 5.85 (w: 0.0 m/s) | 40.72 | 2:17.02 | 5837 | |
| 14 | Marina Damcevska | Yugoslavia | 14.39 | 1.64 | 11.04 | 25.61 (w: 0.4 m/s) | 5.80 (w: 0.0 m/s) | 40.84 | 2:18.00 | 5460 | |
| 15 | Nathalie Teppe | France | 14.12 | 1.73 | 11.79 | 26.30 (w: 0.4 m/s) | 5.36 (w: 1.1 m/s) | 48.30 | 2:29.49 | 5456 | |
| 16 | Clova Court | United Kingdom | 13.83 | NH | 12.87 | 23.81 (w: 0.9 m/s) | 5.56 (w: 0.1 m/s) | 51.52 | 2:26.27 | 5068 | |
| | Liliana Năstase | Romania | 13.46 | 1.73 | 12.32 | 24.49 (w: 0.9 m/s) | 6.44 (w: 1.2 m/s) | 39.20 | | DNF | |
| | Satu Ruotsalainen | Finland | 13.94 | 1.76 | 12.38 | 24.49 (w: 0.4 m/s) | NM | 41.84 | | DNF | |
| | Ingrid Didden | Belgium | 14.23 | 1.73 | 13.27 | | | | | DNF | |
| | Jennifer Kelly | United Kingdom | DNF | 1.67 | | | | | | DNF | |
| | Ragne Kytölä | Finland | DNF | | | | | | | DNF | |

== Participation ==
According to an unofficial count, 21 athletes from 12 countries participated in the event.

- Belgium (1)
- East Germany (3)
- Finland (2)
- France (1)
- Hungary (1)
- Liechtenstein (1)
- Norway (1)
- Romania (2)
- Soviet Union (2)
- United Kingdom (3)
- West Germany (3)
- Yugoslavia (1)

== See also ==
- 1986 Women's European Championships Heptathlon (Stuttgart)
- 1988 Women's Olympic Heptathlon (Seoul)
- 1990 Hypo-Meeting
- 1991 Women's World Championships Heptathlon (Tokyo)
- 1992 Women's Olympic Heptathlon (Barcelona)
