= List of Olympic records in athletics =

Athletics records in the Summer Olympic Games have been recorded since 1896.

The modern Summer Olympic Games have been held every four years since the first Games in 1896 (except 1916 due to the First World War, 1940 and 1944 due to the Second World War, and 2020 due to the COVID-19 pandemic) and Olympic records are recognised by the International Olympic Committee (IOC) in each event. The athletics events, which take place at each Games, are divided into four groups: track events (including sprints, middle- and long-distance running, hurdling and relays), field events (including javelin, discus, hammer, shot put, pole vault, high, long and triple jumps), road events (such as walks and the marathon) and combined events (the heptathlon and the decathlon). Women compete in 23 athletics events during the Games, and men compete in 24; while 21 of the events are the same for both men and women, men exclusively compete in the 50 km walk, the women's combined event is the heptathlon while the men compete in the decathlon, and the short distance hurdles for women is contested over 100 m, ten metres shorter than the men's event.

Some Olympic records have been broken but later rescinded by the IOC. In 1988, Canadian sprinter Ben Johnson broke the Olympic and World record in the 100 metres sprint, but was subsequently disqualified after it was discovered that he had used anabolic steroids to enhance his performance. His record was expunged and the gold medal was instead awarded to original silver medalist American Carl Lewis. Hungarian athlete Róbert Fazekas broke the Olympic record in the men's discus in 2004 but was later stripped of both his gold medal and the record after it was deemed that he had "committed an anti-doping rule violation".

The longest standing modern Olympic athletics record is Bob Beamon's achievement in the men's long jump at the 1968 Summer Olympics. The jump, at 8.90 m (29 ft 2 in), also broke the existing world record by 55 cm (22 in), and stood as the world record for 23 years until Beamon's compatriot, Mike Powell, jumped farther in the 1991 World Championships in Athletics in Tokyo.

Note, only those events currently competed for and recognised by the IOC as Summer Olympic events are listed.

== Key ==
No longer contested at the Summer Olympics

== Men's records ==
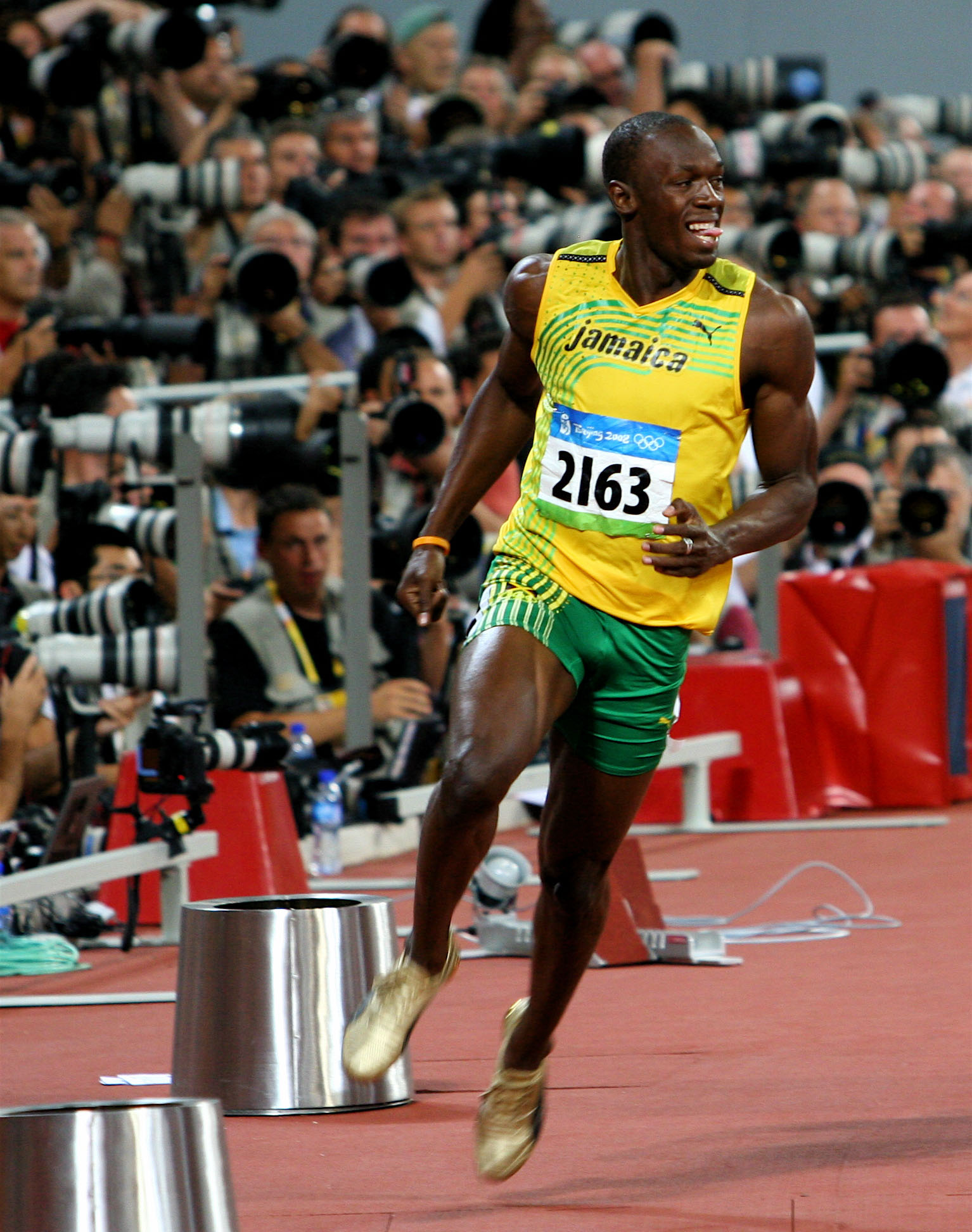
Usain Bolt currently holds three Olympic records; two individually in the 100 m & 200 m, and one with the Jamaican 4 × 100 m relay team.

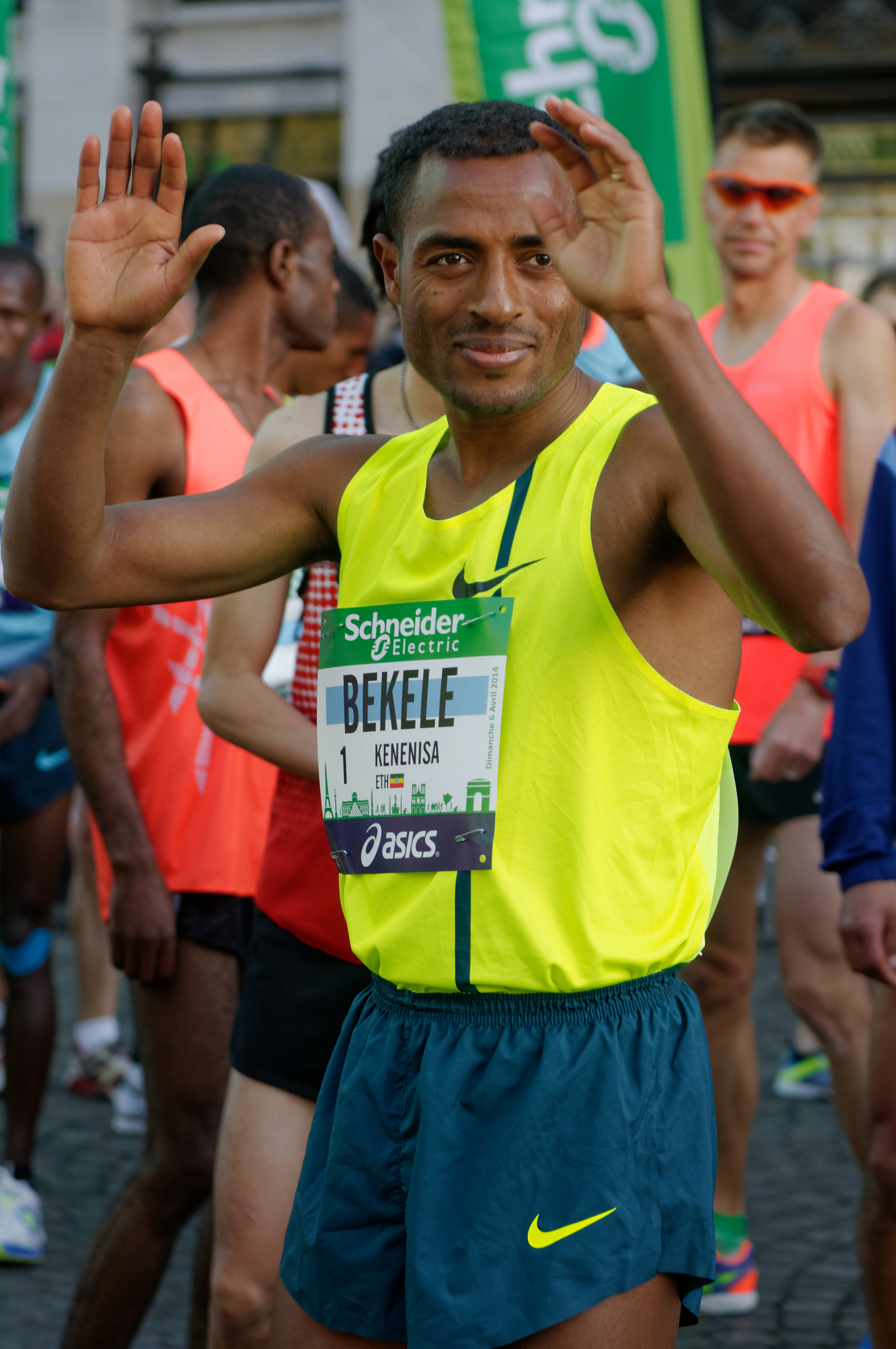
Ethiopian long-distance runner Kenenisa Bekele holds the Olympic record in the 5000 m.

♦ denotes a performance that is also a current world record. Statistics are correct as of August 5, 2024.

List of men's Olympic records in athletics
Event	Record	Athlete(s)	Nation	Games	Date	Ref.
100 metres	9.63	Usain Bolt	Jamaica	2012 London	August 5, 2012	
200 metres	19.30	Usain Bolt	Jamaica	2008 Beijing	August 20, 2008	
400 metres	♦43.03	Wayde van Niekerk	South Africa	2016 Rio de Janeiro	August 14, 2016	
800 metres	♦1:40.91	David Rudisha	Kenya	2012 London	August 9, 2012	
1500 metres	3:27.65	Cole Hocker	United States	2024 Paris	August 6, 2024	
5000 metres	12:57.82	Kenenisa Bekele	Ethiopia	2008 Beijing	August 23, 2008	
10,000 metres	26:43.14	Joshua Cheptegei	Uganda	2024 Paris	August 2, 2024	
Marathon	2:06:26	Tamirat Tola	Ethiopia	2024 Paris	August 10, 2024	
110 metres hurdles	12.91	Liu Xiang	China	2004 Athens	August 27, 2004	
400 metres hurdles	♦45.94	Karsten Warholm	Norway	2020 Tokyo	August 3, 2021	
3000 metres steeplechase	8:03.28	Conseslus Kipruto	Kenya	2016 Rio de Janeiro	August 17, 2016	
4 × 100 m relay	♦36.84	Nesta Carter; Michael Frater; Yohan Blake; Usain Bolt	Jamaica	2012 London	August 11, 2012	
4 × 400 m relay	2:54.43	Christopher Bailey; Vernon Norwood; Bryce Deadmon; Rai Benjamin	United States	2024 Paris	August 10, 2024	
20 km walk	1:18:46	Chen Ding	China	2012 London	August 4, 2012	
50 km walk	3:36:53	Jared Tallent	Australia	2012 London	August 11, 2012	
High jump	2.39 m	Charles Austin	United States	1996 Atlanta	July 28, 1996	
Long jump	8.90 m	Bob Beamon	United States	1968 Mexico City	October 18, 1968	
Pole vault	6.25 m	Armand Duplantis	Sweden	2024 Paris	August 5, 2024	
Triple jump	18.09 m	Kenny Harrison	United States	1996 Atlanta	July 27, 1996	
Shot put	23.30 m	Ryan Crouser	United States	2020 Tokyo	August 5, 2021	
Discus throw	70.00 m	Rojé Stona	Jamaica	2024 Paris	August 7, 2024	
Hammer throw	84.80 m	Sergey Litvinov	Soviet Union	1988 Seoul	September 26, 1988	
Javelin throw	92.97 m	Arshad Nadeem	Pakistan	2024 Paris	August 8, 2024	
Decathlon	9018 pts	Damian Warner	Canada	2020 Tokyo	August 5, 2021	

== Women's records ==
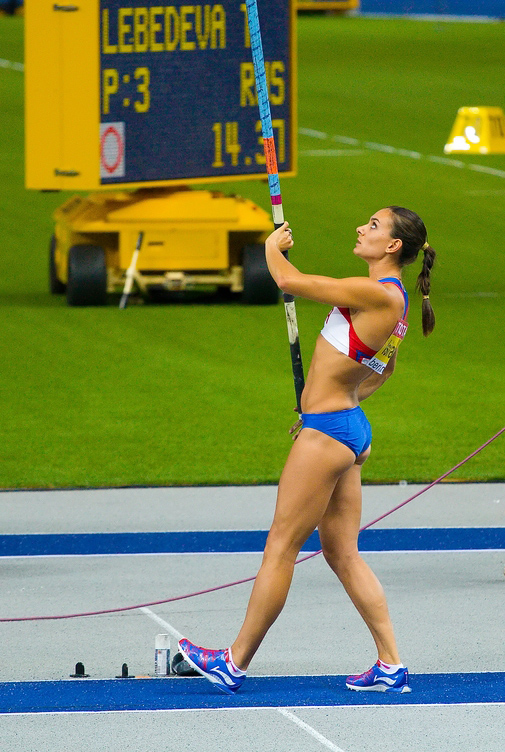
Russian athlete Yelena Isinbayeva set the Olympic record in the pole vault in Beijing in 2008.

♦ denotes a performance that is also a current world record. Statistics are correct as of August 9, 2024.

List of women's Olympic records in athletics
Event	Record	Athlete(s)	Nation	Games	Date	Ref.
100 metres	10.61	Elaine Thompson Herah	Jamaica	2020 Tokyo	July 31, 2021	
200 metres	♦21.34	Florence Griffith Joyner	United States	1988 Seoul	September 29, 1988	
400 metres	48.17	Marileidy Paulino	Dominican Republic	2024 Paris	August 9, 2024	
800 metres	1:53.43	Nadezhda Olizarenko	Soviet Union	1980 Moscow	July 27, 1980	
1500 metres	3:51.29	Faith Kipyegon	Kenya	2024 Paris	August 10, 2024	
5000 metres	14:26.17	Vivian Cheruiyot	Kenya	2016 Rio de Janeiro	August 19, 2016	
10,000 metres	29:17.45	Almaz Ayana	Ethiopia	2016 Rio de Janeiro	August 12, 2016	
Marathon	2:22:55	Sifan Hassan	Netherlands	2024 Paris	August 11, 2024	
100 metres hurdles	12.26	Jasmine Camacho-Quinn	Puerto Rico	2020 Tokyo	August 1, 2021	
400 metres hurdles	♦50.37	Sydney McLaughlin-Levrone	United States	2024 Paris	August 8, 2024	
3000 m steeplechase	8:52.76	Winfred Yavi	Bahrain	2024 Paris	August 6, 2024	
4 × 100 m relay	♦40.82	Tianna Madison; Allyson Felix; Bianca Knight; Carmelita Jeter	United States	2012 London	August 10, 2012	
4 × 400 m relay	♦3:15.17	Tatyana Ledovskaya; Olga Nazarova; Mariya Pinigina; Olga Bryzgina	Soviet Union	1988 Seoul	October 1, 1988	
20 km walk	1:25:16	Qieyang Shijie	China	2012 London	August 11, 2012	
High jump	2.06 m	Yelena Slesarenko	Russia	2004 Athens	August 28, 2004	
Long jump	7.40 m	Jackie Joyner-Kersee	United States	1988 Seoul	September 29, 1988	
Pole vault	5.05 m	Yelena Isinbayeva	Russia	2008 Beijing	August 18, 2008	
Triple jump	15.67 m	Yulimar Rojas	Venezuela	2020 Tokyo	August 1, 2021	
Shot put	22.41 m	Ilona Slupianek	East Germany	1980 Moscow	July 24, 1980	
Discus throw	72.30 m	Martina Hellmann	East Germany	1988 Seoul	September 29, 1988	
Hammer throw	82.29 m	Anita Włodarczyk	Poland	2016 Rio de Janeiro	August 15, 2016	
Javelin throw	71.53 m	Osleidys Menéndez	Cuba	2004 Athens	August 27, 2004	
Heptathlon	♦7291 pts	Jackie Joyner-Kersee	United States	1988 Seoul	September 24, 1988	

== Mixed records ==
♦ denotes a performance that is also a current world record. Statistics are correct as of August 7, 2024.

List of mixed Olympic records in athletics
Event	Record	Athlete(s)	Nation	Games	Date	Ref.
4 × 400 m relay	♦3:07.41	Vernon Norwood; Shamier Little; Bryce Deadmon; Kaylyn Brown	United States	2024 Paris	August 2, 2024	

== Combined event bests ==
The International Olympic Committee maintains a list of the best Olympic results in each decathlon and heptathlon discipline.

List of men's Olympic decathlon bests
Event	Record	Athlete(s)	Nation	Games	Date	Ref.
100 metres	10.12	Damian Warner	Canada	2020 Tokyo	August 3, 2021	
Long jump	8.24 m	Damian Warner	Canada	2020 Tokyo	August 3, 2021	
Shot put	16.97 m	Michael Smith	Canada	1996 Atlanta	July 30, 1996	
High jump	2.27 m	Christian Schenk	East Germany	1988 Seoul	September 27, 1988	
400 metres	45.68	Bill Toomey	United States	1968 Mexico City	October 17, 1968	
110 metres hurdles	13.46	Damian Warner	Canada	2020 Tokyo	August 4, 2021	
Discus throw	53.91 m	Lindon Victor	Grenada	2024 Paris	August 3, 2024	
Pole vault	5.70 m	Tim Bright	United States	1988 Seoul	September 28, 1988	
Javelin throw	77.78 m	Niklas Kaul	Germany	2024 Paris	August 3, 2024	
1500 metres	4:05.90	Leonid Lytvynenko	Soviet Union	1972 Munich	September 8, 1972	

List of women's Olympic heptathlon bests
Event	Record	Athlete(s)	Nation	Games	Date	Ref.
100 metres hurdles	12.54	Jessica Ennis-Hill	Great Britain	2012 London	August 2, 2012	
High jump	1.98 m	Katarina Johnson-Thompson; Nafissatou Thiam	Great Britain; Belgium	2016 Rio de Janeiro	August 11, 2016	
Shot put	17.31 m	Austra Skujyte	Lithuania	2012 London	August 2, 2012	
200 metres	22.56	Jackie Joyner-Kersee	United States	1988 Seoul	September 22, 1988	
Long jump	7.27 m	Jackie Joyner-Kersee	United States	1988 Seoul	September 23, 1988	
Javelin throw	56.96 m	Sofia Ifantidou	Greece	2012 London	August 3, 2012	
800 metres	2:03.60	Olga Nemogayeva	Soviet Union	1980 Moscow (Note: Before 1984, women competed in the pentathlon instead of the heptathlon.)	July 23, 1980	

== See also ==
- List of world records in athletics
