= Kunov =

Kunov or Cunow (Cyrillic: Кунов) is a Slavic masculine surname, its feminine counterpart is Kunova or Cunowa. Notable people with the surname include:

- Alexandra Kunová (born 1992), Slovak figure skater
- Elena Kunova (born 1975), Bulgarian volleyball player
- Emiliya Kunova (born 1960), Bulgarian athlete
- Heinrich Cunow (1862–1936), German politician and Marxist theorist
  - Lensch-Cunow-Haenisch group
