= Masters W35 high jump world record progression =

This is the progression of world record improvements of the high jump W35 division of Masters athletics.

Key

Incomplete information Pending

Height	Athlete	Nationality	Birthdate	Location	Date
2.01	Inga Babakova	Ukraine	27 June 1967	Oslo	27 June 2003
1.99	Inga Babakova	Ukraine	27 June 1967	Oslo	27 June 2003
1.98	Inga Babakova	Ukraine	27 June 1967	Kyiv	20 June 2003
1.98	Inga Babakova	Ukraine	27 June 1967	Filothei	28 May 2003
1.96	Inga Babakova	Ukraine	27 June 1967	Thessaloniki	24 July 2002
1.94	Yelena Panikarovskikh	Russia	4 December 1959	Banská Bystrica	8 February 1995
1.89	Yelena Panikarovskikh	Russia	4 December 1959	Ostrava	1 June 1995
1.88	Cindy Greiner	United States	15 February 1957	New Orleans	20 June1992
1.88	Debbie Brill	Canada	10 March 1953	Walnut	24 April 1988
