= Shubenkov =

Shubenkov (Russian: Шубенков) is a Russian masculine surname, its feminine counterpart is Shubenkova. Notable people with the surname include:

- Natalya Shubenkova (born 1957), Russian heptathlete
- Sergey Shubenkov (born 1990), Russian hurdler, son of Natalya
