= 1986 World Junior Championships in Athletics – Women's heptathlon =

The women's heptathlon event at the 1986 World Junior Championships in Athletics was held in Athens, Greece, at Olympic Stadium on 18 and 19 July.

== Medalists ==
Gold	Svetla Dimitrova; Bulgaria
Silver	Marina Shcherbina; Soviet Union
Bronze	Anke Schmidt; East Germany

== Results ==
=== Final ===
18/19 July

The highest mark recorded in each event is highlighted in yellow

Rank	Name	Nationality	100m H	HJ	SP	200m	LJ	JT	800m	Points	Notes
1st place, gold medalist(s)	Svetla Dimitrova	Bulgaria	13.85 (w: -0.1 m/s)	1.88	12.24	24.32 (w: 1.1 m/s)	6.26	37.16	2:12.29	6041	
2nd place, silver medalist(s)	Marina Shcherbina	Soviet Union	14.46 (w: 0.9 m/s)	1.79	13.01	25.70 (w: 0.8 m/s)	5.97	47.32	2:16.40	5953	
3rd place, bronze medalist(s)	Anke Schmidt	East Germany	13.81 (w: -0.1 m/s)	1.73	11.86	23.93 (w: 1.1 m/s)	6.30	30.70	2:12.23	5900	
4	Peggy Beer	East Germany	14.22	1.73	11.15	25.02	5.76	38.18	2:17.80	5591	
5	Tina Rättyä	Finland	14.39 (w: -0.2 m/s)	1.79	12.46	25.62 (w: 0.7 m/s)	5.72	34.14	2:23.59	5508	
6	Kerstin Reinhardt	West Germany	14.20	1.64	12.10	26.03	5.86	41.38	2:24.79	5457	
7	Margarita Dunayeva	Soviet Union	15.00	1.70	11.92	26.58	5.87	42.28	2:20.04	5433	
8	Sylvia Tornow	West Germany	14.03	1.64	13.34	25.12	5.40	38.18	2:27.73	5408	
9	Jacqueline Kinsella	United Kingdom	14.55 (w: -0.1 m/s)	1.79	9.93	25.73	5.72	26.80	2:11.94	5331	
10	Kristina Rosenqvist	Sweden	14.30	1.70	9.27	25.40	5.80	32.98	2:24.98	5195	
11	Isabelle Dimicelli	France	15.32	1.61	10.54	26.24	5.14	38.68	2:13.34	5044	
12	Peggy Odita	United States	14.97	1.82	8.81	26.70	5.47	30.74	2:20.74	5033	
13	Louise McPaul	Australia	15.76	1.73	10.75	26.87	5.00	47.18	2:28.54	5013	
14	Pam Connell	United States	15.23	1.70	9.02	26.36	5.65	29.26	2:17.93	4956	
15	Yvonne Hasler	Liechtenstein	14.94	1.61	9.94	25.03	5.67	29.90	2:31.65	4904	
16	Kelly-Anne Kempf	Canada	15.62	1.55	11.42	27.27	5.22	40.94	2:27.28	4785	
17	Michelle Parrish	Canada	15.37	1.61	10.10	25.39	4.72	35.34	2:26.44	4728	
	Sharon Jaklofsky-Smith	Australia	14.86	1.67	DNS	DNS	DNS	DNS	DNS	DNF	

== Participation ==
According to an unofficial count, 18 athletes from 12 countries participated in the event.

- Australia (2)
- Bulgaria (1)
- Canada (2)
- East Germany (2)
- Finland (1)
- France (1)
- Liechtenstein (1)
- Soviet Union (2)
- Sweden (1)
- United Kingdom (1)
- United States (2)
- West Germany (2)
