= Svetlana Buraga =

Belarusian heptathlete

Svetlana Buraga (Belarusian: Святлана Бурага; born 4 September 1965 in Minsk, Belarusian SSR) is a retired Belarusian heptathlete.

== Achievements ==
Year	Competition	Venue	Position	Notes
1987	World Championships	Rome, Italy	14th	Heptathlon
	European Combined Events Cup	Arles, France	1st	Heptathlon
1988	Olympic Games	Seoul, South Korea	10th	Heptathlon
1993	World Championships	Stuttgart, Germany	3rd	Heptathlon
1995	World Indoor Championships	Barcelona, Spain	4th	Pentathlon
