= Hsu Huei-ying =

Taiwanese heptathlete

Personal information
- Full name: 許 惠英, Pinyin: Xǔ Huì-yīng
- Nationality: Taiwanese
- Born: 20 March 1969 (age 56)

Sport
- Sport: Athletics
- Event: Heptathlon

Hsu Huei-ying (born 20 March 1969) is a Taiwanese athlete. She competed in the women's heptathlon at the 1988 Summer Olympics.
