= Manuela Marxer =

Liechtensteiner athletics competitor (born 1965)

Personal information
- Born: 5 August 1965 (age 61) Mauren, Liechtenstein
- Height: 1.72 m (5 ft 8 in)
- Weight: 60 kg (132 lb)

Sport
- Sport: Athletics
- Event: Heptathlon
- Club: TV Länggasse

Manuela Marxer-Lippuner (born 5 August 1965) is a retired athlete from Liechtenstein who competed in the heptathlon. She represented her country at four consecutive Summer Olympics, starting in 1984, as well as three World Championships. Her best results came, however, at the European Championships where she finished thirteenth and twelfth in 1990 and 1994 respectively.

Between 1990 and 1994 she was chosen as Liechtenstein sportswoman of the year four consecutive times. She still holds national record in a number of events.

== International competitions ==
Year	Competition	Venue	Position	Event	Notes
Representing Liechtenstein
1984	Olympic Games	Los Angeles, United States	20th	Heptathlon	4913 pts
1987	Games of the Small States of Europe	Monaco, Monaco	1st	100 m hurdles	14.62
1987	Universiade	Zagreb, Yugoslavia	20th (h)	100 m hurdles	14.55
1987	Universiade	Zagreb, Yugoslavia	19th (q)	High jump	1.65 m
1987	World Championships	Rome, Italy	–	Heptathlon	DNF
1988	Olympic Games	Seoul, South Korea	32nd (h)	100 m hurdles	14.38
1989	Games of the Small States of Europe	Nicosia, Cyprus	1st	100 m hurdles	14.32
1989	Games of the Small States of Europe	Nicosia, Cyprus	2nd	4 × 100 m relay	46.92
1989	Games of the Small States of Europe	Nicosia, Cyprus	3rd	Long jump	5.94 m
1990	European Championships	Split, Yugoslavia	13th	Heptathlon	5837 pts
1992	Olympic Games	Barcelona, Spain	24th	Heptathlon	5749 pts
1993	Games of the Small States of Europe	Valletta, Malta	1st	100 m	12.21
1993	Games of the Small States of Europe	Valletta, Malta	1st	100 m hurdles	13.94
1993	Games of the Small States of Europe	Valletta, Malta	2nd	Long jump	5.93 m
1993	Games of the Small States of Europe	Valletta, Malta	3rd	Shot put	12.41 m
1993	World Championships	Stuttgart, Germany	37th (h)	100 m hurdles	13.65
1993	World Championships	Stuttgart, Germany	–	Heptathlon	DNF
1994	European Championships	Helsinki, Finland	12th	Heptathlon	6045 pts
1995	Games of the Small States of Europe	Luxembourg City, Luxembourg	3rd	100 m	11.84
1995	Games of the Small States of Europe	Luxembourg City, Luxembourg	1st	100 m hurdles	13.43
1995	Games of the Small States of Europe	Luxembourg City, Luxembourg	1st	Long jump	5.84 m
1995	Games of the Small States of Europe	Luxembourg City, Luxembourg	1st	Shot put	13.48 m
1995	World Championships	Gothenburg, Sweden	–	Heptathlon	DNF
1996	Olympic Games	Atlanta, United States	–	Heptathlon	DNF

== Personal bests ==
Outdoor

- 100 metres – 11.84 (Luxembourg 1995) NR
- 200 metres – 24.40 (+0.8 m/s, Helsinki 1994)
- 800 metres – 2:12.93 (Helsinki 1994)
- 100 metres hurdles – 13.38 (Jona 1994) NR
- High jump – 1.76 (Split 1990)
- Long jump – 6.13 (+0.9 m/s, Helsinki 1994) NR
- Shot put – 13.53 (Götzis 1996) NR
- Javelin throw (old model) – 41.08 (Barcelona 1992)
- Heptathlon – 6045 (Helsinki 1994) NR

Indoor

- 60 metres – 7.79 (Magglingen 1991) NR
- 60 metres hurdles – 8.41 (Mannheim 1994) NR
- High jump – 1.69 (Magglingen 1994) NR
- Long jump – 5.90 (Mannheim 1994) NR
- Shot put – 13.36 (Magglingen 1994) NR
