= Tsai Lee-chiao =

Taiwanese heptathlete

Personal information
- Full name: 蔡麗嬌, Pinyin: Cài Lì-jiāo
- Nationality: Taiwanese
- Born: 12 August 1962 (age 62)

Sport
- Sport: Athletics
- Event: Heptathlon

Tsai Lee-chiao (born 12 August 1962) is a Taiwanese athlete. She competed in the women's heptathlon at the 1984 Summer Olympics.
