= Alessandra Becatti =

Italian heptathlete

Personal information
- Nationality: Italian
- Born: 30 April 1963 (age 63)

Sport
- Country: Italy
- Sport: Athletics
- Event: Women's heptathlon
- Club: ASSI Giglio Rosso

Achievements and titles
- Personal best: Heptathlon: 5785 pts (1987)

Alessandra Becatti (born 30 April 1965) is an Italian female retired heptathlete, which participated at the 1987 World Championships in Athletics.

== Personal best ==
- Heptathlon: 5785 pts ( (Austria) Götzis, 24 May 1987) at the 1987 Hypo-Meeting
  - 100 m hs: 14.00, high jump: 1.68 m, shot put: 11.34 m, 200 m: 24.58;
  - long jump: 16.17 m, javelin throw: 37.64 m, 800 m: 2:12.18

== Achievements ==
Year	Competition	Venue	Position	Event	Performance	Notes
1987	World Championships	(Italy) Rome	DNF	Heptathlon	NM	

== See also ==
- Italian all-time lists - Heptathlon
