= Ji Jeong-mi =

South Korean heptathlete

Personal information
- Nationality: South Korean
- Born: 4 March 1963 (age 62)

Sport
- Sport: Athletics
- Event: Heptathlon

Ji Jeong-mi (born 4 March 1963) is a South Korean athlete. She competed in the women's heptathlon at the 1988 Summer Olympics.

At the 36th National Men's and Women's Athletics Championships in Seoul Stadium, Ji broke the South Korean record in the heptathlon. She won a bronze medal at the 1986 Asian Games.
