= Anne Brit Skjæveland =

Norwegian heptathlete

Anne Brit Sandberg née Skjæveland
Personal information
- Nationality: Norwegian
- Born: 24 July 1962 (age 64) Stavanger, Rogaland, Norway
- Height: 166 cm (5 ft 5 in)
- Weight: 54 kg (119 lb)

Sport
- Sport: Athletics
- Event: Heptathlon
- Club: IF Minerva, Lillestrøm

Achievements and titles
- Olympic finals: 1992
- Regional finals: 1990
- National finals: Heptathlon: winner 1983, 1985, 1986, 1987 and 1990; Long jump: winner 1987, 1991 and 1993; 100 metre hurdles: winner 1988, 1989 and 1990

Anne Brit Sandberg, née Skjæveland (born 24 July 1962) is a Norwegian retired heptathlete who competed at the 1992 Summer Olympics.

== Biography ==
Skjæveland finished eleventh at the 1990 European Championships, and 22nd at the 1992 Olympic Games.

She was a Norwegian champion in heptathlon five times, in 1983, 1985, 1986, 1987, and 1990. In the 100 metre hurdles she won gold medals in 1988, 1989 and 1990; silver medals in 1996, 1997, 1991 and 1993; and a bronze medal in 1983. She was Norwegian champion in long jump in 1987, 1991 and 1993, won silver medals in 1989 and 1990 and a bronze medal in 1992. In the high jump she won silver medals in 1996, 1997, 1999, 1990 and 1992 and bronze medals in 1981 and 1988. She represented the clubs Sandnes IL, GSK Sandnes and IF Minerva. She was born in Stavanger.

She won the British WAAA Championships title at the 1987 WAAA Championships.

Her personal best score was 6.085 points, achieved in May 1992 in Götzis. It was the Norwegian record for many years. Her best results in single events were 13.43 seconds in the 100 metres hurdles, 1.85 metres in the high jump and 6.30 metres in the long jump.

She is married to Richard Sandberg Hansen, and they have three children, including Niklas, a professional footballer, and Joachim, an athlete. She resides in Sandnes, and is a coach in Sandnes IL. In 2011, she became a central board member in the Norwegian Athletics Association.
