= Marianna Maslennikova =

Russian heptathlete

Marianna Maslennikova (born 17 May 1961) is a Russian female former track and field athlete who competed in the heptathlon for the Soviet Union. She placed fifth at the European Athletics Championships and Goodwill Games in 1986. A bronze medal followed at the European Cup Combined Events in 1987 and she was the seventh-place finisher at the 1987 World Championships in Athletics. He highest international ranking was sixth with 6456 points in the 1987 season. Her personal best score was 6474 points, set in 1988.

== International competitions ==
Year	Competition	Venue	Position	Event	Notes
1986	European Championships	Stuttgart, West Germany	5th	Heptathlon	6396 pts
1986	Goodwill Games	Moscow, Soviet Union	5th	Heptathlon	6416 pts
1987	European Cup Combined Events	Arles, France	3rd	Heptathlon	6434 pts
1987	World Championships	Rome, Italy	7th	Heptathlon	6228 pts
