= Satu Pauri =

Finnish heptathlete (born 1966)

Personal information
- Full name: Satu Marianne Pauri
- Born: Satu Marianne Ruotsalainen; 21 October 1966 (age 59) Oulu, Finland
- Height: 1.74 m (5 ft 9 in)

Sport
- Country: Finland
- Sport: Athletics
- Event: Heptathlon

Achievements and titles
- Olympic finals: 15th at the 1988 Summer Olympics
- World finals: 4th at the 1991 World Championships in Athletics
- Personal best: Heptathlon: 6404 points (August 1991)

Satu Marianne Pauri (née Ruotsalainen; born 21 October 1966 in Oulu) is a retired Finnish heptathlete.

Pauri finished fourth at the 1991 World Championships, where she broke the national record with 6404 points. In June 2025, Saga Vanninen broke a 34-year-old national record with 6563 points.

== Achievements ==
Year	Competition	Venue	Position	Event	Notes
Representing Finland
1988	Olympic Games	Seoul, South Korea	15th	Heptathlon	6101
1991	World Championships	Tokyo, Japan	4th	Heptathlon	6404, NR
1992	Olympic Games	Barcelona, Spain	—	Heptathlon	DNF
