= Kristine Tånnander =

Swedish heptathlete (born 1955)

Personal information
- Born: 21 November 1955 (age 70) Malmö, Sweden
- Height: 179 cm (5 ft 10 in)
- Weight: 61 kg (134 lb)

Sport
- Sport: Athletics
- Event(s): Heptathlon, hurdles, high jump
- Club: Malmö AI

Achievements and titles
- Personal best(s): Heptathlon – 5900 (1982); 100 mH – 13.82; HJ – 1.84 m

Kristine Elisabeth Tånnander (born 21 November 1955) is a retired Swedish hepathlete. Together with her younger sister Annette she competed at the 1982 European Championships, 1983 World Championships and 1984 Summer Olympics and placed 11th–12th. She won the national titles in the 100 m hurdles (1976), pentathlon (1974–75 and 1978–79), heptathlon (1980–83 and 1985), 4 × 100 m relay (1980–82) and 4 × 200 m relay (1978 and 1981–82). Her father Kjell was an Olympic decathlete.
