= Olga Rukavishnikova =

Soviet pentathlete

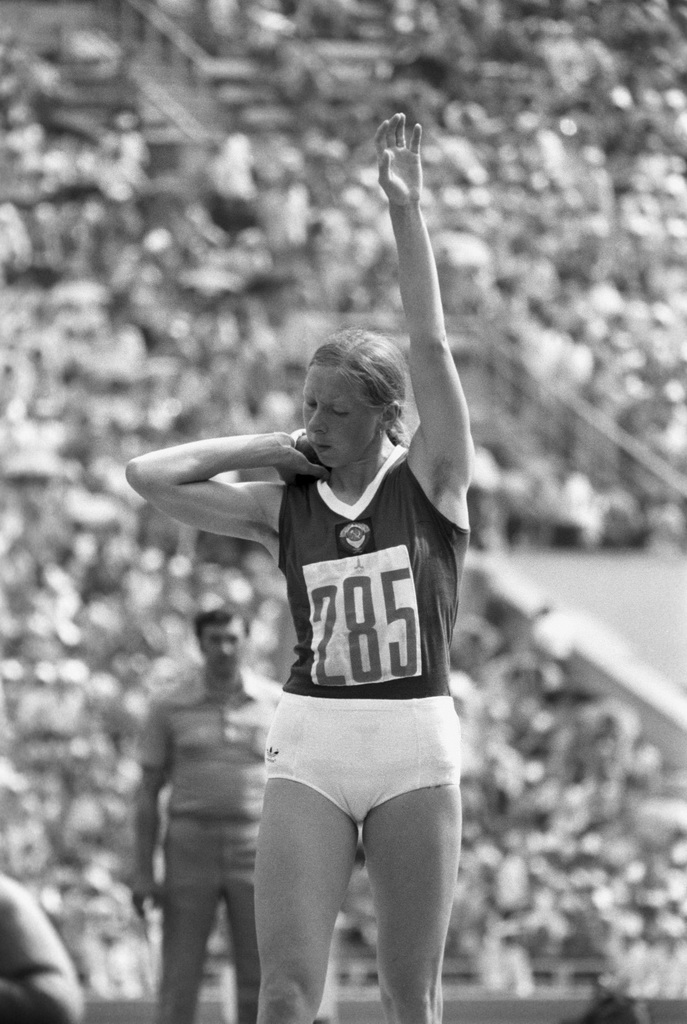
- Rukavishnikova at the Moscow Olympics, 1980

Personal information
- Born: March 13, 1955 (age 71) Severodvinsk, Arkhangelsk
Medal record
Women's Athletics
Representing the Soviet Union
Olympic Games
Silver medal – second place	1980 Moscow	Pentathlon
Summer Universiade
Bronze medal – third place	1975 Rome	Pentathlon

Olga Aleksandrovna Rukavishnikova (Russian: Ольга Александровна Рукавишникова) (born March 13, 1955) is a Soviet athlete who competed in the women's pentathlon event during her career.

== Biography ==
Rukavishnikova competed for the USSR in the 1980 Summer Olympics held in Moscow, in the Pentathlon where she won the silver medal splitting teammates Nadiya Tkachenko and Olga Kuragina for a Soviet clean sweep in what was the last Olympic pentathlon leading to the introduction of the heptathlon for women.

She had the shortest ever reign of a track and field world record holder – 0.4 seconds. When she crossed the finish line at the end of the 800 metres, the final event of the 1980 Olympic pentathlon, her score of 4937 points was a new world record, but 0.4 seconds later Tkachenko finished and set a new record of 5083 points.
