= Cindy Greiner =

American heptathlete and long jumper

Personal information
- Full name: Cynthia Greiner
- Born: Cynthia Suggs; February 15, 1957 (age 69) San Diego, California, U.S.
- Height: 5 ft 9 in (175 cm)

Sport
- Country: United States
- Sport: Athletics
- Event: Heptathlon
Medal record
Women's athletics
Representing the United States
Pan American Games
Gold medal – first place	1987 Indianapolis	Heptathlon
Silver medal – second place	1983 Caracas	Heptathlon

Cynthia Greiner (née Suggs; born February 15, 1957, in San Diego, California) is a retired female heptathlete and long jumper from the United States, who won the gold medal at the 1987 Pan American Games in Indianapolis, United States. She is a two-time U.S. champion (1984 and 1990). Greiner set her personal best (6300 points) in the heptathlon during the 1992 Summer Olympics in Barcelona, Spain.

Greiner competed in the AIAW for the Oregon State Beavers track and field program, running on the 4 × 880 yards relay team with Kathy Weston that qualified for the 1980 AIAW Outdoor Track and Field Championships finals.

== International competitions ==
Year	Competition	Venue	Position	Notes
1983	Pan American Games	Caracas, Venezuela	2nd	Heptathlon
1984	Olympic Games	Los Angeles, United States	4th	Heptathlon
1987	Pan American Games	Indianapolis, United States	1st	Heptathlon
1987	World Championships	Rome, Italy	12th	Heptathlon
1988	Olympic Games	Seoul, South Korea	8th	Heptathlon
1991	World Championships	Tokyo, Japan	10th	Heptathlon
1992	Olympic Games	Barcelona, Spain	9th	Heptathlon
