= Connie Polman-Tuin =

Canadian heptathlete

Personal information
- Full name: Connie Polman-Tuin
- Nationality: Canadian
- Born: 10 January 1963 (age 63) Powell River, British Columbia, Canada

Sport
- Sport: Athletics
- Event: Heptathlon
Medal record
Women's athletics
Representing Canada
Pan American Games
Silver medal – second place	1987 Indianapolis	Heptathlon

Connie Polman-Tuin (born 10 January 1963) is a Canadian former athlete. She competed in the women's heptathlon at the 1984 Summer Olympics.
