= Yvonne Hasler =

Liechtenstein sprinter (born 1968)

Personal information
- Nationality: Liechtenstein
- Born: 13 October 1968 (age 57)

Sport
- Sport: Athletics
- Event(s): Heptathlon, Sprinting

Yvonne Hasler (born 13 October 1968) is a Liechtenstein former heptathlete and sprinter. She competed in the women's 200 metres at the 1988 Summer Olympics.

== International competitions ==
Year	Competition	Venue	Position	Event	Notes
Representing Liechtenstein
1986	World Junior Championships	Athens, Greece	15th	Heptathlon	4904 pts
1986	European Championships	Stuttgart, Germany	–	Heptathlon	DNF
1988	Olympic Games	Seoul, South Korea	44th (h)	200 m	24.91
1989	Games of the Small States of Europe	Nicosia, Cyprus	1st	200 m	24.84
1989	Games of the Small States of Europe	Nicosia, Cyprus	2nd	4 × 100 m relay	46.92
1993	Games of the Small States of Europe	Valletta, Malta	3rd	200 m	25.51
1999	Games of the Small States of Europe	Schaan, Liechtenstein	3rd	400 m	57.37
