= Emiliya Kunova =

Bulgarian pentathlete

Personal information
- Nationality: Bulgarian
- Born: 14 February 1960 (age 65); Sofia, Bulgaria

Sport
- Sport: Athletics
- Event: Pentathlon

Emiliya Kunova (born 14 February 1960) is a Bulgarian athlete. She competed in the women's pentathlon at the 1980 Summer Olympics.
