= Ines Schulz =

German heptathlete

Personal information
- Nationality: German
- Born: 10 July 1965 (age 59); Karl-Marx-Stadt, East Germany

Sport
- Sport: Athletics
- Event: Heptathlon

Ines Schulz (born 10 July 1965) is a German former athlete. She competed in the women's heptathlon at the 1988 Summer Olympics.
