= Joanne Mulliner =

English athlete

Personal information
- Born: 18 August 1966 (age 58); Cosford, Shropshire, England
- Height: 175 cm (5 ft 9 in)
- Weight: 68 kg (150 lb)

Sport
- Sport: Athletics
- Event: Heptathlon
- Club: WBAC

Joanne Carol Mulliner (born 18 August 1966) is a female English former athlete who competed at the Olympic Games.

== Biography ==
Mulliner represented England, at the 1986 Commonwealth Games in Edinburgh, Scotland

In 1987, Mulliner achieved her best score of 6094 points on 7 June 1987 in Arles, to become only the fourth British woman to score over 6000 points, after Tessa Sanderson, Judy Simpson and Kim Hagger. Mulliner became the British heptathlon champion after winning the British AAA Championships title at the 1988 AAA Championships.

Mulliner represented Great Britain in the women's heptathlon at the 1988 Seoul Olympics.

Mulliner represented England, at the 1990 Commonwealth Games in Auckland, New Zealand, where she finished fourth in the heptathlon and shortly afterwards on a second AAA title at the 1990 AAA Championships.

As of 2018, she ranks 11th on the UK all-time list.

== International competitions ==
Year	Competition	Venue	Position	Event	Notes
Representing Great Britain / England
1982	World Gymnasiade	Lille, France	3rd	100 m hurdles	14.54
1982	World Gymnasiade	Lille, France	1st	Long jump	5.89 m
1986	Commonwealth Games	Edinburgh, United Kingdom	4th	Heptathlon	5659w
1986	European Championships	Stuttgart, Germany	14th	Heptathlon	5564
1987	World Championships	Rome, Italy	15th	Heptathlon	5842
1988	Olympic Games	Seoul, South Korea	19th	Heptathlon	5746
1990	Commonwealth Games	Auckland, New Zealand	4th	Heptathlon	5913
1990	European Championships	Split, Yugoslavia	12th	Heptathlon	5849

=== National titles ===
- AAA Championships (1988, 1990)
