= Ragne Kytölä =

Finnish heptathlete

Personal information
- Nationality: Finnish
- Born: 15 March 1965 (age 60) Vaasa, Finland

Sport
- Sport: Athletics
- Event: Heptathlon

Ragne Kytölä (born 15 March 1965) is a Finnish athlete. She competed in the women's heptathlon at the 1988 Summer Olympics.
