= Marjon Wijnsma =

Dutch athletics competitor

Marjon Wijnsma (born 18 July 1965 in Giekerk) is a retired Dutch heptathlete. She competed in the long jump as well. She is a four-times national champion in this discipline, whereas in the heptathlon she became Dutch champion only once.

Her personal best score was 6213 points, achieved in May 1988 in Eindhoven.

== Achievements ==
Year	Tournament	Venue	Result	Extra
1984	Olympic Games	Los Angeles, California	11th	Heptathlon
1988	Olympic Games	Seoul, South Korea	11th	Heptathlon
1989	European Indoor Championships	The Hague, Netherlands	8th	Long jump
