= Marcela Koblasová =

Czech pentathlete

Personal information
- Nationality: Czech
- Born: 15 June 1956 (age 68); Plzeň, Czechoslovakia

Sport
- Sport: Athletics
- Event: Pentathlon

Marcela Koblasová (born 15 June 1956) is a Czech athlete. She competed in the women's pentathlon at the 1980 Summer Olympics.
