= Olga Kuragina =

Soviet pentathlete

Personal information
- Born: Olga Vitalyevna Kuragina; 21 April 1959 (age 67) Kirov, Kirov Oblast
- Height: 170 cm (5 ft 7 in)
- Weight: 57 kg (126 lb)
Medal record
Women's athletics
Representing Soviet Union
Olympic Games
Bronze medal – third place	1980 Moscow	Pentathlon

Olga Vitalyevna Kuragina (Russian: Ольга Витальевна Курагина; born 21 April 1959) is a former Soviet track and field athlete who competed mainly in the pentathlon. Married name Olga Nemogayeva.

She competed for the USSR in the 1980 Summer Olympics held in Moscow, in the Pentathlon where she won the bronze medal behind team mates Nadiya Tkachenko and Olga Rukavishnikova for a Soviet clean sweep in the last Olympic pentathlon competition, after 1980 the women competed in the heptathlon event instead.
