= Anke Behmer =

East German heptathlete

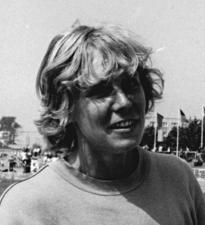
- Behmer in 1983

Personal information
- Born: Anke Vater; 5 June 1961 (age 65) Stavenhagen, Bezirk Neubrandenburg, East Germany
Medal record
Women's athletics
Representing East Germany
Olympic Games
| Bronze medal – third place | 1988 Seoul | Heptathlon |
World Championships
| Bronze medal – third place | 1983 Helsinki | Heptathlon |
European Championships
| Gold medal – first place | 1986 Stuttgart | Heptathlon |

Anke Behmer (née Vater, born 5 June 1961) is a former East German athlete who competed mainly in the heptathlon.

She won the bronze medal for East Germany at the 1988 Summer Olympics held in Seoul, South Korea with a personal best score of 6858 points. This result ranks her fourth among German heptathletes, behind Sabine Braun, Sabine Paetz and Ramona Neubert.
