= Sabine Everts =

German heptathlete (born 1961)

Personal information
- Born: 4 March 1961 (age 65) Düsseldorf, West Germany
- Height: 1.69 m (5 ft 7 in)
- Weight: 56 kg (123 lb)

Sport
- Sport: Heptathlon, long jump
- Club: LAV Düsseldorf; LAV Bayer Uerdingen
Medal record
Women's athletics
Representing West Germany
Olympic Games
Bronze medal – third place	1984 Los Angeles	Heptathlon
European Championships
Bronze medal – third place	1982 Athens	Heptathlon
European Indoor Championships
Gold medal – first place	1982 Milan	Long jump
Bronze medal – third place	1980 Sindelfingen	Long jump
Summer Universiade
Silver medal – second place	1983 Edmonton	Heptathlon

Sabine Christine Everts (born 4 March 1961) is a former West German heptathlete.

== Biography ==
She won a bronze medal at the 1980 European Indoor Championships and the gold medal at the 1982 European Indoor Championships in the long jump. She then won bronze medals in the heptathlon at the 1982 European Championships and the 1984 Summer Olympic Games.

Everts was ranked world #2 in 1981 and #4 in 1982 in the heptathlon, she was world #7 in the long jump in 1982. Domestically she won 22 national titles, and was awarded the Silver Bay Leaf of the German Track and Field Association in 1981.

Sabine Everts is married to athletics coach Hans-Jörg Thomaskamp. They have two sons.
