= Valentina Dimitrova =

Bulgarian heptathlete

Personal information
- Born: May 4, 1956 Kostenets, Bulgaria
- Died: November 2, 2014 (aged 58) Sofia, Bulgaria

Sport
- Sport: Track and field
Medal record
Representing Bulgaria
Summer Universiade
Gold medal – first place	1977 Sofia	Pentathlon

Valentina Spasova Dimitrova (Bulgarian: Валентина Димитрова) (May 4, 1956 – November 2, 2014) was a heptathlete who competed for Bulgaria during her career. She won the gold medal at the 1977 Summer Universiade. Dimitrova set her personal best (6440 points) in the heptathlon on 29 May 1983 at a meet in Götzis.

== Achievements ==
Year	Competition	Venue	Position	Notes
1977	Universiade	Sofia, Bulgaria	1st	Pentathlon
1980	Olympic Games	Moscow, Soviet Union	7th	Heptathlon
1982	European Championships	Athens, Greece	6th	Heptathlon
1983	World Championships	Helsinki, Finland	6th	Heptathlon
