= Natalya Shubenkova =

Russian former Soviet heptathlete (born 1957)

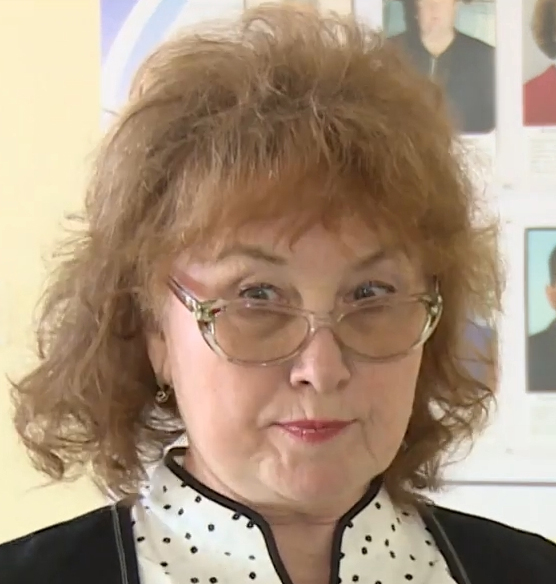
- Natalya Shubenkova in March 2020

Personal information
- Born: 25 September 1957 (age 68) Srosty, Altai Krai, Russia
- Height: 177 cm (5 ft 10 in)
- Weight: 65 kg (143 lb)

Sport
- Sport: Athletics
- Event(s): Heptathlon, hurdles
- Club: Dynamo Barnaul

Achievements and titles
- Personal best(s): 100 mH – 12.93 (1984); Heptathlon – 6859 (1984)
Medal record
Women's athletics
Representing Soviet Union
European Championships
Silver medal – second place	1986 Stuttgart	Heptathlon

Natalya Mikhaylovna Shubenkova (Russian: Наталья Михайловна Шубенкова; born 25 September 1957) is a Russian former Soviet heptathlete. As of 2019, she ranks as the 12th highest all-time female scorer in the heptathlon, based on a score of 6859 she achieved in 1984. That ended up being the second highest score in 1984, bested only by Sabine John, and stood as the Soviet record for six years. She was unable to participate in the 1984 Olympics due to the 1984 Summer Olympics boycott.

Shubenkova was part of the Soviet athletic team from 1980 to 1992, and won several nationwide championships in the heptathlon. Other top performances included a fourth-place finish at the 1988 Olympics, and a bronze medal at the 1986 Goodwill Games.

After retiring from competitions, Shubenkova served as a sports administrator in her native Altai Krai. Her son Sergey Shubenkov won the world title in 110 metres hurdles in 2015.

== International competitions ==
Year	Competition	Venue	Position	Notes
Representing Soviet Union
1982	European Championships	Athens, Greece	5th	6321
1983	World Championships	Helsinki, Finland	DNF	851
1984	Friendship Games	Prague, Czechoslovakia	DNF	—
1986	Goodwill Games	Moscow, Soviet Union	3rd	6631
1986	European Championships	Stuttgart, Germany	2nd	6645
1988	Olympic Games	Seoul, South Korea	4th	6540
1989	European Cup	Tønsberg, Norway	3rd	6345
DNF = Did not finish
