= Małgorzata Guzowska =

Personal information
- Born: February 9, 1959 (age 67) Białystok, Podlaskie, Poland

Sport
- Sport: Track and field
Medal record
Representing Poland
Summer Universiade
| Gold medal – first place | 1981 Bucharest | Heptathlon |
| Gold medal – first place | 1985 Kobe | Heptathlon |

Małgorzata Bożena Guzowska-Nowak (born February 9, 1959) is a retired Polish heptathlete.

== Biography ==
She twice won the gold medal at the Summer Universiade during her career. Guzowska set her personal best (4459 points) in the pentathlon in 1980. Her best of 6616 points in the heptathlon remained the Polish national record for the event until 2022.

She represented her country at the 1980 Summer Olympics and was twelfth in the women's pentathlon. At the 1982 European Athletics Championships, she came twelfth. She was fourth in the heptathlon at the 1984 Friendship Games. In 1986 she won the Décastar heptathlon title and came sixth at the 1986 European Athletics Championships.

At national level, she won five straight heptathlon titles from 1980 to 1984 and also won the 100 metres hurdles title in 1986. At the indoor Polish championships, she was a four-time pentathlon champion as well as having a shot put title and two wins in the 60 metres hurdles.

== Achievements ==
| Year | Competition | Venue | Position | Notes |
|---|---|---|---|---|
| 1980 | Olympic Games | Moscow, Soviet Union | 12th | Heptathlon |
| 1981 | Universiade | Bucharest, Romania | 1st | Heptathlon |
| 1985 | Universiade | Kobe, Japan | 1st | Heptathlon |
