= Chantal Beaugeant =

French athletics competitor (born 1961)

Personal information
- Nationality: French
- Born: 16 February 1961 (age 65) Saint-Étienne, France
- Height: 1.70 m (5 ft 7 in)

Sport
- Event(s): Combined Events, 400 m hurdles
- Club: AS Aix-les-Bains

Chantal Beaugeant (French pronunciation: [ʃɑ̃tal boʒɑ̃]; born 16 February 1961) is a French former heptathlete. In 1989, Beaugeant was banned by the French Athletics Federation for two years after testing positive for performance-enhancing steroids.

== Biography ==
She won four French National Athletic titles, three in the heptathlon in 1984, 1985 and 1988, and one in the 400 hurdles in 1986.

She six times improved the French record in the heptathlon, bringing it to 6,702 pts on 18 June 1988 at the Hypo-Meeting.

She participated in the heptathlon in the 1984 Olympics and 1988 Olympics but did not finish the competition either time. In 1988 in Seoul, she reached the semifinals of the 400m hurdles. In 1986, she placed 8th in the heptathlon at the European Championships at Stuttgart.

=== Prize list ===
- French Championships in Athletics :
  - winner of the heptathlon 1984, 1985 and 1988.
  - winner of the 400m hurdles in 1986

=== Records ===
Personal records
Event	Performance	Location	Date
Heptathlon	6,702 pts	Götzis	19 June 1988

== Performance-enhancing steroids suspension ==
In June 1989, Beaugeant was suspended by the French Athletics Federation (FAF) for two years after failing a doping test during A spokesman for the FAF said traces of the performance-enhancing substance nandrolone were found in Beaugeant's urine sample after the French inter-club championships in Dreux on May 28. A second test on June 24 confirmed the results. Beaugeant was the first female athlete to ever be suspended for doping in France since tests were first mandated by the FAF in 1976.

== Notes and references ==
- Fédération Française d'Athlétisme, ed. (2003), Docathlé 2003, Fédération française d'athlétisme, pp. 45, 116, 146, 174, 389, ISBN 2-9512343-3-3
