= Florence Picaut =

French athlete

Florence Picaut (born 25 October 1952 in Paris) is a French athlete (1 m 67, 56 kg), and a specialist in heptathlon, from the club at Stade Français from 1974 (at CS Blanc-Mesnil from 1967 to 1973).

== Honours ==
- 48 selections for France A, from 1969 to 1984 (and 5 for juniors)
- French record holder for heptathlon eight times up to 1981, and twice in 1982 with 5899 pts
- Gold medal in pentathlon at the Mediterranean Games 1979
- French champion in heptathlon seven times, in 1974, and from 1978 to 1983
- French high jump champion 1978
- French long jump champion 1980
- French modern pentathlon champion 1982
- Silver medal in 4 × 400 m relay at the Mediterranean games 1979
- Bronze medallist in pentathlon at European Junior Championships 1970
- Olympic finalist in pentathlon 1980 and 1984

Sporting positions
Preceded by (France) Marie-Christine Debourse	Women's French National Champion; 1978	Succeeded by (France) Véronique Dumon
