= Sabine John =

East German heptathlete

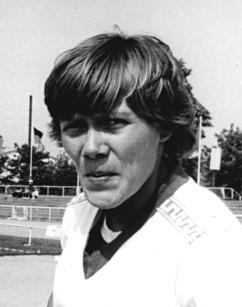
- Sabine Paetz in 1983

Personal information
- Born: 16 October 1957 (age 68) Döbeln, Bezirk Leipzig, East Germany
Medal record
Women's athletics
Representing East Germany
Olympic Games
Silver medal – second place	1988 Seoul	Heptathlon
World Championships
Silver medal – second place	1983 Helsinki	Heptathlon
European Championships
Silver medal – second place	1982 Athens	Heptathlon

Sabine John (née Möbius, divorced Paetz, born 16 October 1957) is a retired East German heptathlete. She broke the world record in 1984 with a score of 6946 points, and won silver medals at the 1983 World Championships, and the 1988 Olympic Games.

== Career ==
Born in Döbeln, Bezirk Leipzig, John competed for the sports club SC DHfK Leipzig during her career. As Sabine Möbius, she won the silver medal in the heptathlon at the 1982 European Championships, behind fellow East German Ramona Neubert. Competing under her first married name of Sabine Paetz, she won the silver medal in the heptathlon at the 1983 World Championships, again behind Neubert.

On 6 May 1984, she broke Neubert's world record of 6935 points, with a score of 6946 in Potsdam. This score ranks her second on the German all-time list behind Sabine Braun, and eighth on the world all-time list. She was prevented from competing at the 1984 Olympic Games due to the Soviet-led boycott, but did finish second to Yordanka Donkova in the 100 metres hurdles at the 1984 Friendship Games. She finished fourth at the 1986 Goodwill Games with a score of 6456, in a competition won by Jackie Joyner-Kersee with the world record score of 7148.

Competing under her second married name of Sabine John, she won the silver medal in the heptathlon at the 1988 Olympic Games in Seoul with the second best score of her career, 6897 points. The competition was won with the still-standing 7291 point world record performance of Jackie Joyner-Kersee. In Seoul, John also finished eighth in the long jump final.

John's 100 metres hurdles best of 12.54 seconds, ranks her equal fourth with Kerstin Knabe on the German all-time list, behind Bettine Jahn, Gloria Uibel and Cornelia Oschkenat. Her long jump best of 7.12 metres, ranks her fifth on the German all-time list, behind Heike Drechsler, Malaika Mihambo, Helga Radtke, and Sosthene Moguenara.

Records
Preceded by (East Germany) Ramona Neubert	Women's Heptathlon World Record Holder; 6 May 1984 – 7 July 1986	Succeeded by (United States) Jackie Joyner-Kersee
Sporting positions
Preceded by (East Germany) Ramona Neubert	Women's Heptathlon Best Year Performance; 1984	Succeeded by (United States) Jackie Joyner-Kersee
