= Annette Tånnander =

Swedish Olympic athlete (born 1958)

Annette Viveka Tånnander-Bank (born Annette Tånnander on 13 February 1958 in Malmö, Sweden) is a Swedish athlete who competed in the heptathlon and high jump events. She represented her native country twice in the Olympics: She was seventh in the 1976 Montreal Olympic high jump, clearing 1.87 m, and finished 14th in the 1984 Los Angeles Olympic heptathlon with 5,908 points.

Tannander competed in the AIAW for the Colorado Buffaloes track and field team, qualifying for the high jump finals at the 1979 AIAW Outdoor Track and Field Championships.
