= Tineke Hidding =

Dutch heptathlete (born 1959)

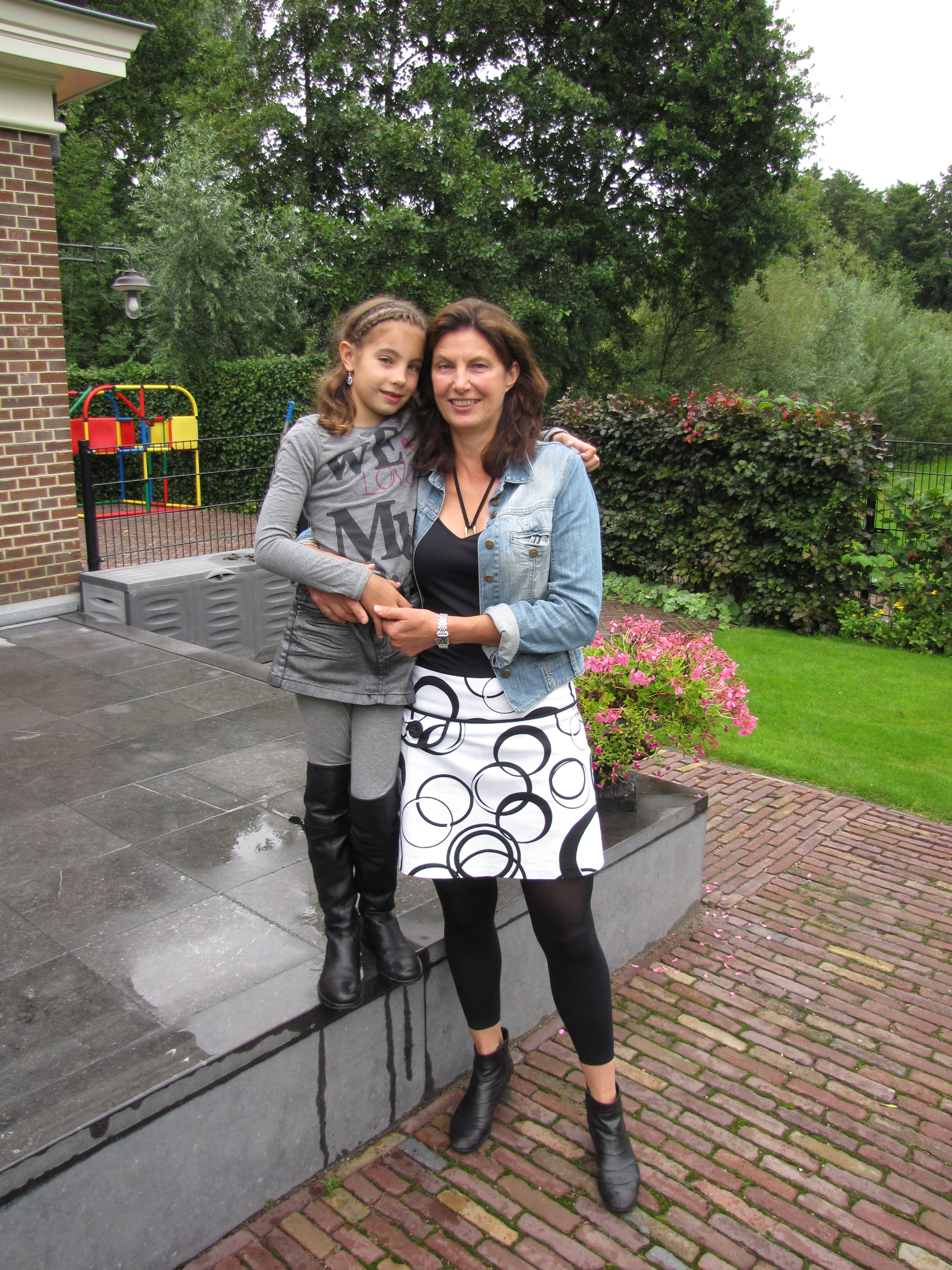
- Tineke Hidding with her daughter Tosca in their home garden in Zuid-Scharwoude in 2010

Personal information
- Born: 28 July 1959 (age 66) Deventer, the Netherlands
- Height: 1.74 m (5 ft 9 in)
- Weight: 62 kg (137 lb)

Sport
- Sport: Heptathlon, long jump
- Club: Hera, Heerhugowaard

Jantien "Tineke" Johanna Alida Hidding (born 28 July 1959) is a retired Dutch heptathlete. She competed at the 1984 and 1988 Olympics and finished in seventh place in 1984.

Her personal best score was 6176 points, achieved in May 1988 in Eindhoven. Her personal best in the long jump was 6.61 metres, achieved in July 1988 in Roosendaal.

Between 1978 and 1990 Hidding won 14 outdoor and 15 indoor national titles.

== Achievements ==
Year	Tournament	Venue	Result	Event
1983	World Championships	Helsinki, Finland	8th	Heptathlon
1984	Olympic Games	Los Angeles, United States	7th	Heptathlon
1986	European Championships	Stuttgart, West Germany	11th	Heptathlon
1987	World Championships	Rome, Italy	13th	Heptathlon
1989	European Indoor Championships	The Hague, Netherlands	7th	Long jump
