= Kim Hagger =

British athlete

Personal information
- Nationality: British (English)
- Born: 2 December 1961 (age 64) Plaistow, Essex, England
- Height: 171 cm (5 ft 7 in)
- Weight: 62 kg (137 lb)

Sport
- Sport: Athletics
- Event(s): Heptathlon, long jump
- Club: Essex Ladies Athletics Club
Medal record
Athletics
Representing England
Commonwealth Games
| Bronze medal – third place | 1986 Edinburgh | heptathlon |

Kim Hagger (born 2 December 1961) is a retired English athlete who competed mainly in the heptathlon and the long jump. She represented Great Britain at the 1984 Los Angeles Olympics and the 1988 Seoul Olympics.

== Biography ==
Hagger was born in Plaistow, Essex. She won the AAA Championships Under 15 long jump title in 1975 and 1976, and the Under 17 title in 1977 and 1978.

Hagger then moved to Manhattan, Kansas, where she competed in United States collegiate Association for Intercollegiate Athletics for Women (AIAW) events. She was an All-American for the Kansas State Wildcats track and field team, placing 6th in the women's pentathlon at the 1981 AIAW Indoor Track and Field Championships. She left the team in 1982 due to a coaching change.

She competed at her first Olympic Games in Los Angeles 1984, finishing eighth in the heptathlon with 6127 points. In 1986, she reached her peak at both heptathlon and long jump. In May, she achieved a score of 6259 in Arles. As of 2014, this still ranks her sixth on the UK all-time heptathlon list. Later in 1986, she won the UK long jump title, before going on to win a bronze medal in the heptathlon for England at the Commonwealth Games in Edinburgh, with a score of 5823. She also finished fourth in the long jump. Two weeks later at the European Championships in Stuttgart, she finished ninth in the heptathlon with 6173. That score included a lifetime best long jump performance of 6.70 m.

In 1987, Hagger finished second behind Mary Berkeley in the long jump event at the 1987 WAAA Championships. and finished ninth in the heptathlon at the World Championships in Rome, with a score of 6167. At her second Olympics in Seoul 1988, she finished 17th with 5975. She also finished 17th overall in the long jump qualifying round.

In 1989, she won the AAAs national heptathlon title.

She represented England, at the 1990 Commonwealth Games in Auckland, New Zealand. She won her final national title in 1991, when she won the AAAs Indoor long jump championship for the third time.

She was known for her complex theory on how to hold the javelin.

== National titles ==
- 1986 UK Long Jump champion
- 1989 AAAs Heptathlon champion
- 1988/90/91 AAAs Indoor Long Jump champion

== International competitions ==
| Year | Competition | Venue | Position | Event | Notes |
Representing Great Britain and England
| 1984 | Olympic Games | Los Angeles, United States | 8th | Heptathlon | 6127 pts |
| 1986 | Commonwealth Games | Edinburgh, Scotland | 4th | Long jump | 6.34 m |
| 1986 | Commonwealth Games | Edinburgh, Scotland | 3rd | Heptathlon | 5823 |
| 1986 | European Championships | Stuttgart, Germany | 9th | Heptathlon | 6173 |
| 1987 | World Championships | Rome, Italy | 9th | Heptathlon | 6167 |
| 1988 | Olympic Games | Seoul, South Korea | 17th (q) | Long jump | 6.34 m |
| 1988 | Olympic Games | Seoul, South Korea | 17th | Heptathlon | 5975 |
| 1990 | Commonwealth Games | Auckland, New Zealand | 9th | Long jump | 6.27 m |
| 1990 | Commonwealth Games | Auckland, New Zealand | — | Heptathlon | DNF |
| 1990 | European Indoor Championships | Glasgow, Scotland | 11th | Long jump | 6.21 m |

Note: Results with a Q, indicate overall position in qualifying round.
