= Ramona Neubert =

East German heptathlete

Ramona Neubert (née Göhler, later Raulf, born 26 July 1958 in Pirna, Bezirk Dresden) is a former heptathlete from East Germany. Her biggest triumph was winning the world title at the inaugural 1983 World Championships in Helsinki, Finland. She would break the world record four consecutive times in the early 1980s.

== Achievements ==
| Year | Tournament | Venue | Result | Event |
|---|---|---|---|---|
| 1978 | European Championships | Prague, Czechoslovakia | 6th | Pentathlon |
| 1980 | Olympic Games | Moscow, Soviet Union | 4th | Pentathlon |
| 1982 | European Championships | Athens, Greece | 1st | Heptathlon |
| 1983 | World Championships | Helsinki, Finland | 1st | Heptathlon |

Records
| Preceded by (Soviet Union) Nadezhda Vinogradova | Women's Heptathlon World Record Holder; 24 May 1981 – 6 May 1984 | Succeeded by (East Germany) Sabine John |
Sporting positions
| Preceded by (Soviet Union) Zoya Spasovkhodskaya | Women's Heptathlon Best Year Performance; 1981–1983 | Succeeded by (East Germany) Sabine John |
