= Judy Simpson =

British heptathlete (born 1960)

Personal information
- Born: Judith Earline Veronica Livermore; 14 November 1960 (age 65) Kingston, Jamaica

Sport
- Sport: Heptathlon and 100m hurdles
- Club: Rugby & District AC, Rugby; Birchfield Harriers
Medal record
Women's Athletics
Representing England
Commonwealth Games
Gold medal – first place	1986 Edinburgh	Heptathlon
Silver medal – second place	1982 Brisbane	Heptathlon
Bronze medal – third place	1990 Auckland	Heptathlon
Representing Great Britain
European Championships
Bronze medal – third place	1986 Stuttgart	Heptathlon
World Student Games (Universiade)
Bronze medal – third place	1983 Edmonton	Heptathlon
Bronze medal – third place	1985 Kobe	Heptathlon

Judith Earline Veronica Simpson (née Livermore; born 14 November 1960) is a British former heptathlete who competed at three Olympic Games and one World Athletics Championships, with a highest Olympic finish of fifth in the 1984 Games in Los Angeles.

She was the 1986 Commonwealth Games champion in heptathlon, and won further medals at two more Commonwealth Games, the European Athletics Championships and the World Student Games, now knows as the Universiade.

Following her retirement from athletics, she went on to appear as Nightshade in the TV show Gladiators between 1993 and 1996.

== Early life ==
She went to Harris School. She competed in Tae Kwan Do, becoming the English champion, and was in the English team. She lived on Wood Street.

== Athletics career ==
Simpson was born in Jamaica, but brought up in Rugby, Warwickshire. She competed in the pentathlon at the 1980 Summer Olympics in Moscow, in the heptathlon and high jump at the 1984 Summer Olympics in Los Angeles, and in the heptathlon at the 1988 Summer Olympics in Seoul, Republic of Korea, as well as the heptathlon at the 1983 World Championships in Athletics. She competed in three Commonwealth Games; the 1982 Commonwealth Games in Brisbane, Australia, the 1986 Commonwealth Games in Edinburgh, Scotland, and the 1990 Commonwealth Games in Auckland, New Zealand, winning a silver, gold and bronze respectively in the heptathlon. She was also the Three A's heptathlon champion in 1982 and 1983. In 1986, Simpson won a bronze medal in the heptathlon at the European Championships in Stuttgart with a personal best points total of 6623.

== Television ==
In 1987, Simpson participated in Prince Edward's charity television special The Grand Knockout Tournament. Between 1993 and 1996, she featured in the British television show Gladiators as "Nightshade". After appearing in an Ashes competition with Australian Gladiators, she became ill. She appeared for a few episodes of the 1996 series but was later forced to pull out.

== Personal life ==
In 1999, Simpson's daughter, Joan Mary, died of meningitis, following a nationwide outbreak of the disease.

== Achievements ==
Year	Competition	Venue	Position	Event	Notes
Representing Great Britain / England
1980	Olympic Games	Moscow, Soviet Union	13th	pentathlon	4304
1982	European Championships	Athens, Greece	7th	heptathlon	6287
1982	Commonwealth Games	Brisbane, Australia	5th	100 m hurdles	13.25
1982	Commonwealth Games	Brisbane, Australia	2nd	heptathlon	6214
1983	World Student Games (Universiade)	Edmonton, Canada	3rd	heptathlon	6184
1983	World Championships	Helsinki, Finland	—	heptathlon	DNF
1984	Olympic Games	Los Angeles, United States	19th (q)	high jump	1.84 m
1984	Olympic Games	Los Angeles, United States	5th	heptathlon	6280
1985	World Student Games (Universiade)	Kobe, Japan	3rd	heptathlon	6046
1986	Commonwealth Games	Edinburgh, Scotland	1st	heptathlon	6282
1986	European Championships	Stuttgart, West Germany	3rd	heptathlon	6623
1988	Olympic Games	Seoul, South Korea	—	heptathlon	DNF
1990	Commonwealth Games	Auckland, New Zealand	3rd	heptathlon	6085
