= Athletics at the 1984 Summer Olympics – Men's decathlon =

Men's decathlon at the Games of the XXIII Olympiad
- Venue: Los Angeles Memorial Coliseum
- Date: 8 August 1984; 9 August 1984
- Competitors: 26 from 18 nations
- Winning result: 8797 OR

Medalists
1st place, gold medalist(s)		Daley Thompson; Great Britain
2nd place, silver medalist(s)		Jürgen Hingsen; West Germany
3rd place, bronze medalist(s)		Siegfried Wentz; West Germany

Official Video Highlights

These are the official results of the men's decathlon competition at the 1984 Summer Olympics in Los Angeles, California. There were a total number of 26 participating athletes, with the competition starting on August 8, 1984, and ending on August 9, 1984.

== Medalists ==
Gold	Daley Thompson; Great Britain
Silver	Jürgen Hingsen; West Germany
Bronze	Siegfried Wentz; West Germany

== Abbreviations ==
DNS	did not start
NM	no mark
OR	olympic record
WR	world record
AR	area record
NR	national record
PB	personal best
SB	season best

== Schedule ==
August 8, 1984
1. 100 m
2. Long Jump
3. Shot Put
4. High Jump
5. 400 m

August 9, 1984
6. 110 m hurdles
7. Discus Throw
8. Pole Vault
9. Javelin Throw
10. 1,500 m

== Records ==
Earlier in 1984 the IAAF had updated its decathlon scoring tables; the tables set in 1962 (with effect from 1964) would be replaced on 1 April 1985. The world record performance at the changeover date would be recalculated using the new tables and become the new world record. In the event that another performance had a lower total on the 1962 tables but a higher one on the 1984 tables, it would not supersede the pre-existing record.

These were the standing world and Olympic records (in points) prior to the 1984 Summer Olympics:

Record	1962 tables	1984 tables	Athlete	Venue	Date
World record	8798	8832	(West Germany) Jürgen Hingsen	Mannheim (FRG)	June 9, 1984
Olympic record	8618/8617 (Note: Jenner's 1976 performance was officially calculated as 8618 using a 400m time of 50.0. From 1977, the IAAF required 400m times accurate to 100th of a second; Jenner's 50.04 was worth one point less. Both figures have been quoted subsequently.)	8634	(United States) Bruce Jenner	Montreal (CAN)	July 30, 1976

Daley Thompson's time in the Olympic 110mH was initially recorded as 14.34, on which basis he started the final 1500m needing 4:34.8 to beat Hingsen's world record, or 4:34.9 to equal it. After slowing at the end to enjoy his triumph, he finished in 4:35.0, giving a points total of 8797, one below the world record (still a new Olympic record). The time was over 14 seconds outside his personal best. Under the 1984 tables (taking effect in 1985) Thompson's 8797 scored 8846, whereas Hingsen's 8798 was only 8832. Nevertheless, Hingsen retained the record under the IAAF's grandfather rule.

In 1986, the IAAF re-examined the photo finish of Thompson's Olympic 110mH, found it was one-thousandth of a second faster than initially thought, and rounded his time down from 14.34 to 14.33. This gave him one extra point, thereby retrospectively equalling Hingsen's 8798 under the 1962 tables, and scoring 8847 on the 1984 tables. The IAAF ruled on 15 July 1986 that Thompson was co-holder of the world record from 9 August 1984 until 1 April 1985, and sole holder thereafter.

== Results ==
The highest mark recorded in each event is highlighted in yellow. These marks were split between six competitors with the gold medallist claiming three of them.

Rank	Athlete	Nationality	100m	LJ	SP	HJ	400m	110m H	DT	PV	JT	1500m	Points	Notes
1st place, gold medalist(s)	Daley Thompson	Great Britain	10.44	8.01	15.72	2.03	46.97	14.33	46.56	5.00	65.24	4:35.00	8798	EWR (Note: Originally 8797 OR)
2nd place, silver medalist(s)	Jürgen Hingsen	West Germany	10.91	7.80	15.87	2.12	47.69	14.29	50.82	4.50	60.44	4:22.60	8673	
3rd place, bronze medalist(s)	Siegfried Wentz	West Germany	10.99	7.11	15.87	2.09	47.78	14.35	46.60	4.50	67.68	4:33.96	8412	
4	Guido Kratschmer	West Germany	10.80	7.40	15.93	1.94	49.25	14.66	47.28	4.90	69.40	4:47.99	8326	
5	William Motti	France	11.28	7.45	14.42	2.06	48.13	14.71	50.92	4.50	63.76	4:35.15	8266	
6	John Crist	United States	11.33	6.98w	14.05	2.06	48.45	15.01	46.18	4.80	61.88	4:23.78	8130	
7	Jim Wooding	United States	11.04	7.01	13.90	1.97	47.62	14.57	47.38	4.60	57.20	4:28.31	8091	
8	Dave Steen	Canada	11.20	7.41w	12.57	2.03	48.09	15.39	44.04	4.80	56.92	4:17.70	8047	
9	Georg Werthner	Austria	11.41	6.96	13.80	1.94	49.44	15.36	41.18	4.70	76.96	4:16.41	8012	
10	Michele Rüfenacht	Switzerland	10.72	6.96	13.86	2.00	48.63	14.57	45.30	4.30	55.10	4:39.47	7924	
11	Bradley McStravick	Great Britain	10.92	6.82	13.38	1.94	48.68	15.01	45.54	4.30	61.54	4:25.15	7890	
12	Tim Bright	United States	11.22	6.75	13.80	2.00	48.87	14.52	41.74	5.40	53.66	4:49.27	7862	
13	Patrick Vetterli	Switzerland	11.44	7.13	13.88	2.03	49.83	15.14	43.82	4.50	64.66	4:55.06	7739	
14	Peter Hadfield	Australia	11.15	7.13	13.68	1.76	48.50	15.05	43.36	4.50	55.22	4:25.90	7683	
15	Weng Kangqiang	China	11.28	7.30	12.45	1.88	50.52	15.21	38.74	4.60	69.72	4:34.10	7662	
16	Ku Chin-shui	Chinese Taipei	11.42	6.89	12.76	2.03	50.59	14.91	39.70	4.90	62.36	4:50.75	7629	
17	Trond Skramstad	Norway	11.20	7.18	14.20	1.85	49.25	15.08	40.02	4.50	54.94	4:43.02	7579	
18	Douglas Fernández	Venezuela	11.59	6.74	13.12	1.88	49.83	16.05	43.52	4.40	67.12	4:23.96	7553	
19	Lee Fu-an	Chinese Taipei	10.98	7.00	13.02	2.03	49.67	15.49	37.10	4.50	54.96	4:45.87	7541	
20	Colin Boreham	Great Britain	11.46	6.90	13.51	1.97	50.19	15.48	44.10	4.20	52.66	4:32.50	7485	
21	Mohamed Mansour Salah	Qatar	11.51	6.62	11.54	1.88	52.04	16.20	36.26	3.50	45.02	4:35.64	6589	
22	Claudio Escauriza	Paraguay	11.66	6.51	14.10	1.82	53.06	17.51	47.76	4.00	64.16	DNF	6546	
23	Fidel Solórzano	Ecuador	11.15	6.99	10.09	1.94	49.24	16.22	33.54	3.10	48.66	5:07.38	6519	
24	Ángel Díaz	Guatemala	11.54	6.48	9.62	1.91	52.08	16.02	28.68	3.30	47.96	4:26.11	6342	
25	Vivian Coralie	Mauritius	11.37	5.84w	9.79	1.82	51.28	16.39	32.92	3.00	41.58	4:26.26	6084	
	Albert Miller	Fiji	11.48	6.32	13.07	1.91	50.22	15.36	38.46	NM	DNS	–	DNF	

== See also ==
- 1982 Men's European Championships Decathlon
- 1983 Men's World Championship Decathlon
- 1984 Men's Friendship Games Decathlon (Moscow)
- 1986 Men's European Championships Decathlon
