= 1978 European Athletics Championships – Men's decathlon =

Men's decathlon at the European Athletics Championships

The men's decathlon at the 1978 European Athletics Championships was held in Prague, then Czechoslovakia, at Stadion Evžena Rošického on 30 and 31 August 1978.

== Medalists ==
Gold	Aleksandr Grebenyuk; Soviet Union
Silver	Daley Thompson; Great Britain
Bronze	Siegfried Stark; East Germany

== Results ==
KEY:	DNS	Did not start	DNF	Did not finish	CR	Championships record	NR	National record	PB	Personal best	SB	Seasonal best

=== Final ===
30/31 August

The highest mark recorded in each event is highlighted in yellow

Rank	Name	Nationality	100m	LJ	SP	HJ	400m	110m H	DT	PV	JT	1500m	Points	Notes
1st place, gold medalist(s)	Aleksandr Grebenyuk	Soviet Union	11.02	6.94	15.93	2.01	48.88	14.43	48.42	4.50	67.74	4:24.4	8337 (8340)	CR
2nd place, silver medalist(s)	Daley Thompson	Great Britain	10.69	7.93	14.69	2.04	47.77	15.28	43.52	4.20	59.80	4:22.84	8257 (8289)	
3rd place, bronze medalist(s)	Siegfried Stark	East Germany	11.17	7.30	15.04	1.95	49.57	15.12	44.52	4.90	69.00	4:24.0	8224 (8208)	
4	Sepp Zeilbauer	Austria	11.12	7.32	14.81	1.92	49.55	14.61	45.22	4.70	60.36	4:41.6	7969 (7988)	
5	Yuriy Kutsenko	Soviet Union	11.02	7.24	14.82	1.98	49.23	15.34	43.76	4.40	57.74	4:22.9	7918 (7978)	
6	Roger Kanerva	Finland	11.18	7.22	13.32	2.01	49.62	15.28	41.82	4.80	61.60	4:25.4	7923 (7945)	
7	Johannes Lahti	Finland	10.86	7.08	14.06	2.07	49.64	15.00	41.36	4.00	67.98	4:36.7	7875 (7913)	
8	Rainer Pottel	East Germany	11.05	7.40	15.05	1.92	48.04	14.89	32.80	4.90	56.24	4:29.5	7883 (7900)	
9	Holger Schmidt	West Germany	10.96	7.16	15.74	1.95	49.66	14.84	48.12	4.10	59.82	5:01.1	7778 (7829)	
10	Yves Le Roy	France	11.27	7.17	14.38	1.89	49.65	15.11	47.96	4.70	56.32	4:46.6	7748 (7780)	
11	Thierry Dubois	France	10.99	7.23	13.78	1.95	49.58	14.97	42.82	4.00	66.80	4:54.4	7664 (7705)	
12	Vladimir Buryakov	Soviet Union	11.45	7.12	14.01	1.95	50.20	15.11	40.58	4.70	57.86	4:37.7	7629 (7670)	
13	Jürgen Hingsen	West Germany	11.39	7.39	13.94	1.98	50.22	15.33	39.72	4.10	58.66	4:28.47	7585 (7640)	
14	Dietmar Schauerhammer	East Germany	10.81	7.21	14.91	1.86	47.59	15.02	41.96	4.00	51.70	4:52.0	7548 (7635)	
15	Atanas Andonov	Bulgaria	11.15	6.94	13.54	1.92	51.00	14.77	41.50	4.40	58.34	4:39.4	7527 (7590)	
16	Jaromír Frič	Czechoslovakia	11.39	7.08	13.58	1.92	50.76	15.40	45.32	4.80	52.96	4:55.0	7469 (7516)	
17	Armin Tschenett	Switzerland	10.98	7.01	13.15	1.92	48.74	15.47	34.30	4.10	49.14	4:30.8	7266 (7362)	
18	Christer Lythell	Sweden	11.39	7.17	13.55	1.83	50.12	15.43	45.42	4.00	53.08	4:41.7	7287 (7362)	
19	Elias Sveinsson	Iceland	11.24	6.17	14.17	1.95	51.50	15.48	43.64	4.20	57.14	4:44.8	7225 (7317)	
20	Luděk Pernica	Czechoslovakia	11.55	6.72	13.43	1.89	51.41	15.18	42.46	4.30	48.90	4:29.64	7203 (7290)	
21	Árpád Kiss	Hungary	11.34	6.83	14.45	1.95	51.02	15.05	42.20	3.80	50.70	5:02.0	7103 (7202)	
22	Kenneth Riggsberger	Sweden	11.39	6.62	13.46	1.80	50.15	16.08	39.60	4.20	50.88	4:41.5	6957 (7063)	
	Georg Werthner	Austria	11.39	7.11	13.46	1.92	50.49	15.48	35.92	4.20	68.70		DNF	
	Guido Kratschmer	West Germany	DNF										DNF	

== Participation ==
According to an unofficial count, 24 athletes from 13 countries participated in the event.

- Austria (2)
- Bulgaria (1)
- Czechoslovakia (2)
- East Germany (3)
- Finland (2)
- France (2)
- Hungary (1)
- Iceland (1)
- Soviet Union (3)
- Sweden (2)
- Switzerland (1)
- Great Britain (1)
- West Germany (3)
