= Athletics at the 1976 Summer Olympics – Men's decathlon =

Men's decathlon at the Games of the XXI Olympiad
- Venue: Olympic Stadium
- Date: 29–30 July 1976
- Competitors: 28 from 16 nations
- Winning points: 8618 WR

Medalists
1st place, gold medalist(s)		Bruce Jenner (Note: Jenner underwent gender transition in 2015 and is now known as Caitlyn Jenner.); United States
2nd place, silver medalist(s)		Guido Kratschmer; West Germany
3rd place, bronze medalist(s)		Mykola Avilov; Soviet Union

The Men's decathlon competition at the 1976 Summer Olympics in Montreal, Quebec, Canada, was held at the Olympic Stadium on 29–30 July.

== Competition format ==
The decathlon consists of ten track and field events, with a points system that awards higher scores for better results in each of the ten components. The athletes all compete in one competition with no elimination rounds. At the end of competition, if two athletes are tied, the athlete who has received more points in the greater number of events is the winner.

== Records ==
Before the competition, the existing World and Olympic records were as follows.

World record	Bruce Jenner (USA)	8538	Eugene, Oregon, United States	26 June 1976
Olympic record	Mykola Avilov (URS)	8466	Munich, West Germany	8 September 1972

== Overall results ==
Key

The highest mark recorded in each event is highlighted in yellow. The best scores were split between eight competitors with the gold medallist claiming the best discus score.

Rank	Athlete	Points	100 m	LJ	SP	HJ	400 m	110 m H	DT	PV	JT	1500 m
1	Bruce Jenner (USA)	8618	819; 10.94 s	865; 7.22 m	809; 15.35 m	882; 2.03 m	923; 47.51 s	866; 14.84 s	873; 50.04 m	1005; 4.80 m	862; 68.52 m	714; 4:12.61 min
2	Guido Kratschmer (FRG)	8411	890; 10.66 s	899; 7.39 m	773; 14.74 m	882; 2.03 m	889; 48.19 s	895; 14.58 s	794; 45.70 m	957; 4.60 m	837; 66.32 m	595; 4:29.09 min
3	Mykola Avilov (URS)	8369	749; 11.23 s	925; 7.52 m	777; 14.81 m	975; 2.14 m	889; 48.16 s	939; 14.20 s	792; 45.60 m	920; 4.45 m	789; 62.28 m	614; 4:26.26 min
4	Raimo Pihl (SWE)	8218	822; 10.93 s	818; 6.99 m	821; 15.55 m	857; 2.00 m	898; 47.97 s	767; 15.81 s	768; 44.30 m	909; 4.40 m	961; 77.34 m	597; 4:28.76 min
5	Ryszard Skowronek (POL)	8113	799; 11.02 s	873; 7.26 m	712; 13.74 m	779; 1.91 m	903; 47.91 s	876; 14.75 s	788; 45.34 m	1005; 4.80 m	788; 62.22 m	590; 4:29.89 min
6	Siegfried Stark (GDR)	8048	721; 11.35 s	816; 6.98 m	793; 15.08 m	779; 1.91 m	847; 49.14 s	782; 15.65 s	790; 45.48 m	969; 4.65 m	926; 74.18 m	625; 4:24.93 min
7	Leonid Lytvynenko (URS)	8025	775; 11.12 s	804; 6.92 m	740; 14.20 m	779; 1.91 m	880; 48.44 s	880; 14.71 s	805; 46.26 m	957; 4.60 m	681; 53.66 m	724; 4:11.41 min
8	Lennart Hedmark (SWE)	7974	719; 11.36 s	838; 7.09 m	789; 15.00 m	779; 1.91 m	814; 49.80 s	871; 14.79 s	808; 46.42 m	884; 4.30 m	974; 78.58 m	498; 4:44.28 min
9	Aleksandr Grebenyuk (URS)	7803	780; 11.10 s	721; 6.53 m	770; 14.69 m	831; 1.97 m	842; 49.21 s	843; 15.05 s	821; 47.16 m	807; 4.00 m	861; 68.42 m	527; 4:39.62 min
10	Claus Marek (FRG)	7767	852; 10.81 s	867; 7.23 m	692; 13.42 m	779; 1.91 m	943; 47.12 s	828; 15.19 s	654; 38.40 m	884; 4.30 m	664; 52.32 m	604; 4:27.84 min
11	Johannes Lahti (FIN)	7711	831; 10.89 s	877; 7.28 m	706; 13.66 m	857; 2.00 m	838; 49.34 s	816; 15.31 s	656; 38.52 m	859; 4.20 m	782; 61.72 m	489; 4:45.90 min
12	Ryszard Katus (POL)	7616	790; 11.06 s	828; 7.04 m	695; 13.48 m	716; 1.84 m	810; 49.87 s	902; 14.51 s	730; 42.28 m	932; 4.50 m	731; 57.54 m	482; 4:47.00 min
13	Luděk Pernica (TCH)	7602	710; 11.40 s	814; 6.97 m	701; 13.58 m	804; 1.94 m	788; 50.37 s	841; 15.07 s	690; 40.22 m	909; 4.40 m	702; 55.26 m	643; 4:22.30 min
14	Philippe Bobin (FRA)	7580	787; 11.07 s	848; 7.14 m	736; 14.12 m	779; 1.91 m	814; 49.79 s	853; 14.96 s	682; 39.84 m	1028; 4.90 m	643; 50.74 m	410; 4:59.65 min
15	Fred Samara (USA)	7504	841; 10.85 s	836; 7.08 m	665; 13.00 m	716; 1.84 m	801; 50.07 s	862; 14.87 s	696; 40.54 m	884; 4.30 m	680; 53.60 m	523; 4:40.21 min
16	Georg Werthner (AUT)	7493	731; 11.31 s	848; 7.14 m	696; 13.49 m	751; 1.88 m	801; 50.08 s	821; 15.26 s	596; 35.58 m	832; 4.10 m	810; 64.08 m	607; 4:27.43 min
17	Gilles Gémise-Fareau (FRA)	7486	768; 11.15 s	765; 6.74 m	606; 12.10 m	804; 1.94 m	801; 50.09 s	860; 14.89 s	688; 40.12 m	957; 4.60 m	660; 52.04 m	557; 4:31.81 min
18	Daley Thompson (GBR)	7434	857; 10.79 s	859; 7.19 m	671; 13.10 m	779; 1.91 m	889; 48.15 s	750; 15.98 s	612; 36.36 m	859; 4.20 m	566; 45.18 m	592; 4:29.55 min
19	Roger Lespagnard (BEL)	7322	754; 11.21 s	806; 6.93 m	680; 13.24 m	804; 1.94 m	852; 48.99 s	780; 15.67 s	658; 38.64 m	859; 4.20 m	584; 46.40 m	545; 4:36.67 min
20	Runald Beckman (SWE)	7319	799; 11.02 s	810; 6.95 m	699; 13.54 m	751; 1.88 m	775; 50.66 s	785; 15.62 s	732; 42.40 m	807; 4.00 m	738; 58.14 m	423; 4:57.28 min
21	Eberhard Stroot (FRG)	7063	867; 10.75 s	897; 7.38 m	695; 13.48 m	751; 1.88 m	918; 47.61 s	824; 15.23 s	682; 39.82 m	0 NM	823; 65.10 m	606; 4:27.48 min
22	Tito Steiner (ARG)	7052	717; 11.37 s	763; 6.73 m	719; 13.85 m	716; 1.84 m	792; 50.30 s	766; 15.82 s	691; 40.26 m	754; 3.80 m	629; 49.74 m	505; 4:43.16 min
23	Fred Dixon (USA)	6754	819; 10.94 s	802; 6.91 m	755; 14.44 m	882; 2.03 m	880; 48.38 s	574; 18.11 s	797; 45.82 m	0 NM	711; 55.96 m	534; 4:38.49 min
—N/a	Sepp Zeilbauer (AUT)	DNF	785; 11.08 s	875; 7.27 m	783; 14.91 m	882; 2.03 m	856; 48.94 s	862; 14.87 s	768; 44.26 m	0 NM	DNS	DNS
—N/a	Régis Ghesquière (BEL)	DNF	668; 11.59 s	818; 6.99 m	737; 14.15 m	779; 1.91 m	792; 50.32 s	778; 15.69 s	698; 40.64 m	DNS	DNS	DNS
—N/a	Elías Sveinsson (ISL)	DNF	685; 11.51 s	686; 6.37 m	724; 13.94 m	804; 1.94 m	728; 51.77 s	731; 16.19 s	724; 41.98 m	DNS	DNS	DNS
—N/a	Eltjo Schutter (NED)	DNF	763; 11.17 s	844; 7.12 m	582; 11.74 m	680; 1.80 m	0 DNF	DNS	DNS	DNS	DNS	DNS
—N/a	Heikki Leppänen (FIN)	DNF	641; 11.71 s	710; 6.48 m	DNS	DNS	DNS	DNS	DNS	DNS	DNS	DNS
—N/a	Yves Le Roy (FRA)	DNS	DNS	DNS	DNS	DNS	DNS	DNS	DNS	DNS	DNS	DNS
—N/a	Michael Corden (GBR)	DNS	DNS	DNS	DNS	DNS	DNS	DNS	DNS	DNS	DNS	DNS
