= 1982 European Athletics Championships – Men's decathlon =

Men's decathlon at the European Athletics Championships

These are the official results of the men's decathlon competition at the 1982 European Athletics Championships in Athens, Greece. The competition was held on 7 September and 8 September 1982. Points are based on the 1962 scoring tables.

== Medalists ==
Gold	(United Kingdom) Daley Thompson; Great Britain (GBR)
Silver	Jürgen Hingsen; West Germany (FRG)
Bronze	Siegfried Stark; East Germany (GDR)

KEY:	DNF	Did not finish	CR	Championships record	NR	National record	PB	Personal best	SB	Seasonal best	w	Wind assisted

The highest mark recorded in each event is highlighted in yellow

Rank	Name	100m	LJ	SP	HJ	400m	110m H	DT	PV	JT	1500m	Points
1st place, gold medalist(s)	Daley Thompson (GBR)	10.51	7.80	15.44	2.03	47.11	14.39	45.48	5.00	63.56	4:23.71	8743
2nd place, silver medalist(s)	Jürgen Hingsen (FRG)	11.01	7.58	15.52	2.15	48.10	14.61	44.74	4.80	60.42	4:22.22	8517
3rd place, bronze medalist(s)	Siegfried Stark (GDR)	11.30	7.31	15.71	2.03	48.76	14.89	48.64	5.00	67.38	4:23.52	8422
4	Steffen Grummt (GDR)	11.10	7.16	15.95	1.91	49.16	14.78	49.08	4.60	65.32	4:27.05	8217
5	Georg Werthner (AUT)	11.16	7.33	14.11	2.03	48.73	15.08	39.82	4.50	70.66	4:14.89	8171
6	Grigoriy Degtyaryev (URS)	11.07	7.22	14.94	2.00	49.84	14.75	49.32	4.60	57.12	4:23.15	8160
7	Valeriy Kachanov (URS)	11.11	7.44	14.00	2.03	48.64	14.47	45.46	4.20	57.30	4:18.98	8116
8	Christian Gugler (SUI)	11.44	7.05	12.99	2.03	49.91	14.87	44.82	4.80	68.24	4:21.95	8035
9	Guido Kratschmer (FRG)	11.02	7.26	14.77	1.91	49.03	14.65	43.84	4.30	61.54	4:24.24	8015
10	Atanas Andonov (BUL)	11.34	6.69	15.15	2.06	51.09	14.91	48.20	4.60	62.08	4:40.72	7904
11	Michele Rüfenacht (SUI)	10.73	6.94	13.43	1.97	48.38	14.57	45.20	4.00	56.66	4:31.03	7873
12	Martin Machura (TCH)	10.97	7.14	15.39	2.06	49.78	16.38	46.72	4.50	59.78	5:05.06	7794
13	Colin Boreham (GBR)	11.23	7.11	13.71	2.06	48.90	14.81	38.80	4.00	57.96	4:25.16	7762
14	Harri Sundell (FIN)	11.12	7.38	14.25	2.00	49.30	15.11	42.90	4.20	57.62	4:49.95	7744
15	Christer Lythell (SWE)	11.45	6.93	14.76	1.88	49.35	15.14	46.88	4.20	60.08	4:31.17	7672
16	Adam Bagiński (POL)	11.38	6.69	13.81	2.00	50.49	15.27	45.00	4.50	58.58	4:35.00	7659
17	Conny Silfver (SWE)	11.35	6.70	13.77	1.91	50.09	15.07	42.12	4.40	55.92	4:29.56	7551
18	Trond Skramstad (NOR)	11.20	6.80	13.11	1.94	49.27	14.94	35.06	4.30	59.68	4:30.16	7517
19	Gudmund Olsen (NOR)	11.64	6.68	14.96	1.91	52.28	15.58	45.72	4.30	63.56	4:35.59	7506
20	Siegfried Wentz (FRG)	11.17	7.17	15.81	2.03	48.15	14.52	45.86	—	63.64	4:35.38	7284
21	Konstantin Akhapkin (URS)	11.11	7.54	14.46	1.97	49.41	15.08	48.88				DNF
22	Tsetsko Mitrakiev (BUL)	11.32	6.99	13.26	1.97	50.80	15.15	39.26				DNF
23	Stefan Niklaus (SUI)	10.77	7.25	15.03	2.00	47.66	16.75					DNF
24	Dariusz Ludwig (POL)	11.22	7.55	13.99	2.06	50.61	15.27					DNF
25	Torsten Voss (GDR)	10.80	7.04	12.83	2.00	48.07	16.97					DNF
26	Robert De Wit (NED)	11.40	6.46	13.23	2.00	48.72						DNF
27	Johannes Lahti (FIN)	11.26	6.94	13.88								DNF

== Participation ==
27 athletes from 13 countries participated in the event.

- Austria (1)
- Bulgaria (2)
- Czechoslovakia (1)
- East Germany (3)
- Finland (2)
- Netherlands (1)
- Norway (2)
- Poland (2)
- Soviet Union (3)
- Sweden (2)
- Switzerland (3)
- United Kingdom (2)
- West Germany (3)

== See also ==
- Athletics at the 1980 Summer Olympics – Men's decathlon
- 1982 Decathlon Year Ranking
- 1983 World Championships in Athletics – Men's decathlon
- Athletics at the 1984 Summer Olympics – Men's decathlon
