= Athletics at the 1980 Summer Olympics – Men's decathlon =

Men's decathlon at the Games of the XXII Olympiad
- Venue: Lenin Central Stadium
- Date: 25 July 1980; 26 July 1980
- Competitors: 21 from 12 nations
- Winning result: 8495

Medalists
| 1st place, gold medalist(s) | | Daley Thompson; Great Britain |
| 2nd place, silver medalist(s) | | Yuriy Kutsenko; Soviet Union |
| 3rd place, bronze medalist(s) | | Sergei Zhelanov; Soviet Union |

These are the official results of the Men's Decathlon competition at the 1980 Summer Olympics in Moscow, USSR. There were a total number of 21 participating athletes, with the competition starting on 25 July 1980, and ending on 26 July 1980.

== Medalists ==
| Gold | Daley Thompson; Great Britain |
| Silver | Yuriy Kutsenko; Soviet Union |
| Bronze | Sergey Zhelanov; Soviet Union |

== Schedule ==
July 25, 1980
1. 100 m
2. Long Jump
3. Shot Put
4. High Jump
5. 400 m

July 26, 1980
6. 110 m hurdles
7. Discus Throw
8. Pole Vault
9. Javelin Throw
10. 1,500 m

== Results ==
The highest mark recorded in each event is highlighted in yellow. These marks were split between eight competitors with the gold medallist claiming three of them.

| Rank | Athlete | Nationality | 100m | LJ | SP | HJ | 400m | 110m H | DT | PV | JT | 1500m | Points | Notes |
|---|---|---|---|---|---|---|---|---|---|---|---|---|---|---|
| 1st place, gold medalist(s) | Daley Thompson | Great Britain | 10.62 | 8.00 | 15.18 | 2.08 | 48.01 | 14.47 | 42.24 | 4.70 | 64.16 | 4:39.9 | 8495 | |
| 2nd place, silver medalist(s) | Yuriy Kutsenko | Soviet Union | 11.19 | 7.74 | 14.50 | 2.08 | 48.67 | 15.04 | 39.86 | 4.90 | 68.08 | 4:22.6 | 8331 | |
| 3rd place, bronze medalist(s) | Sergey Zhelanov | Soviet Union | 11.40 | 7.60 | 14.17 | 2.18 | 49.27 | 14.83 | 42.80 | 4.60 | 57.30 | 4:27.5 | 8135 | |
| 4 | Georg Werthner | Austria | 11.44 | 7.27 | 13.45 | 2.03 | 49.26 | 15.08 | 38.14 | 4.85 | 73.66 | 4:23.4 | 8050 | |
| 5 | Sepp Zeilbauer | Austria | 11.29 | 7.14 | 15.31 | 2.03 | 50.91 | 14.80w | 44.00 | 4.50 | 64.86 | 4:30.6 | 8007 | |
| 6 | Dariusz Ludwig | Poland | 11.35 | 7.51 | 13.32 | 2.08 | 50.55 | 15.38w | 45.82 | 4.80 | 58.38 | 4:29.7 | 7978 | |
| 7 | Atanas Andonov | Bulgaria | 11.38 | 6.86 | 15.59 | 2.00 | 50.36 | 14.83 | 47.62 | 4.70 | 53.54 | 4:29.2 | 7927 | |
| 8 | Steffen Grummt | East Germany | 11.35 | 6.86 | 16.15 | 1.94 | 49.39 | 14.82 | 48.56 | 4.30 | 55.24 | 4:30.2 | 7892 | |
| 9 | Esa Jokinen | Finland | 11.40 | 7.27 | 14.12 | 2.06 | 49.06 | 15.62 | 40.48 | 4.20 | 67.38 | 4:34.4 | 7826 | |
| 10 | Janusz Szczerkowski | Poland | 11.22 | 7.38 | 14.06 | 2.00 | 49.64 | 14.57 | 44.74 | 4.90 | 45.22 | 4:44.9 | 7822 | |
| 11 | Johannes Lahti | Finland | 11.32 | 7.20 | 14.28 | 2.03 | 50.06 | 15.14 | 42.44 | 4.60 | 56.94 | 4:44.0 | 7765 | |
| 12 | Stephan Niklaus | Switzerland | 11.17 | 6.93 | 14.29 | 1.97 | 49.74 | 14.96 | 42.18 | 4.30 | 66.54 | 4:44.9 | 7762 | |
| 13 | Peter Hadfield | Australia | 11.04 | 7.36 | 13.34 | 1.85 | 48.40 | 15.18w | 45.08 | 4.40 | 56.12 | 4:44.7 | 7709 | |
| 14 | Razvigor Yankov | Bulgaria | 11.26 | 6.61 | 16.28 | 1.85 | 50.37 | 15.69w | 48.02 | 4.60 | 58.12 | 4:51.2 | 7624 | |
| 15 | Bradley McStravick | Great Britain | 10.97 | 6.74 | 13.53 | 1.91 | 48.80 | 15.23w | 39.46 | 4.30 | 57.98 | 4:31.0 | 7616 | |
| 16 | Columba Blango | Sierra Leone | 11.40 | 6.40 | 10.00 | 1.85 | 53.48 | 15.45 | 23.08 | NM | 36.20 | 5:22.9 | 5080 | |
| | Miro Ronac | Peru | 11.88 | 6.72 | 12.60 | 1.91 | 52.45 | 17.19 | 46.42 | 4.40 | 56.34 | DNS | DNF | |
| | Valeriu Caceanov | Soviet Union | 11.22 | 7.65 | 14.70 | 2.08 | 48.67 | 14.40w | 46.02 | NM | DNS | – | DNF | |
| | Sandro Brogini | Italy | 11.41 | 7.33 | 13.02 | 2.06 | 50.97 | 15.21 | 39.54 | NM | DNS | – | DNF | |
| | Rainer Pottel | East Germany | 11.16 | NM | 14.32 | DNS | – | – | – | – | – | – | DNF | |
| | Siegfried Stark | East Germany | 11.27 | 7.00 | DNS | – | – | – | – | – | – | – | DNF | |

== See also ==
- 1982 Men's European Championships Decathlon (Athens)
- 1983 Men's World Championship Decathlon (Helsinki)
- 1986 Men's European Championships Decathlon (Stuttgart)
