= Athletics at the Friendship Games – Men's decathlon =

The men's decathlon event at the Friendship Games was held on 17 and 18 August 1984 at the Grand Arena of the Central Lenin Stadium in Moscow, Soviet Union.

== Results ==
The highest mark recorded in each event is highlighted in yellow

Rank	Athlete	Nationality	100m	LJ	SP	HJ	400m	110m H	DT	PV	JT	1500m	Points	Notes
1st place, gold medalist(s)	Grigoriy Degtyaryov	Soviet Union	10.99	7.58	15.54	2.09	50.29	14.60	49.20	5.10	63.20	4:27.14	8523	
2nd place, silver medalist(s)	Torsten Voss	East Germany	10.59	8.02	15.39	2.06	48.06	14.44	42.34	5.10	58.22	4:52.96	8450	
3rd place, bronze medalist(s)	Igor Sobolevskiy	Soviet Union	10.67	7.98	16.07	2.00	48.34	15.08	46.46	4.70	64.86	4:45.58	8433	
–	Aleksandr Nevskiy	Soviet Union	11.01	7.46	15.57	2.03	50.06	14.90	46.98	4.70	68.32	4:25.98	8356	
–	Yuriy Kutsenko	Soviet Union	11.34	7.26	14.85	2.06	50.13	15.35	48.62	4.60	64.76	4:26.25	8134	
–	Viktor Gruzenkin	Soviet Union	11.05	7.20	15.35	2.00	50.48	14.96	46.62	4.60	60.28	4:45.21	7982	
–	Pavel Tarnovetskiy	Soviet Union	11.18	7.29	14.40	2.00	49.63	15.10	42.34	4.60	52.46	4:28.73	7860	
4	Atanas Andonov	Bulgaria	11.22	7.16	15.80	1.97	51.53	15.63	47.80	4.70	54.26	4:47.60	7783	
5	Aleksandr Apaychev	Soviet Union	10.87	7.47	16.20	2.00	48.88	13.97	35.92	4.60	67.38	DNF	7698	
6	Martin Machura	Czechoslovakia	11.18	6.98	15.46	2.00	50.38	17.15	47.78	4.40	53.00	4:59.99	7508	
7	Hans-Ulrich Riecke	East Germany	10.72	7.51	14.96	1.97	49.60	15.67	41.06	4.70	57.10	DNF	7429	

== See also ==
- Athletics at the 1984 Summer Olympics – Men's decathlon
