= Men's heptathlon world record progression =

The following table shows the men's heptathlon world record progression starting in 1970 and ratified by IAAF from 1986.

== Record progression ==
Ratified world records
Ratified
Not ratified
Ratified but later rescinded
Pending ratification

Athlete	Venue	Date	Points
(West Germany) Hans-Joachim Walde	Mainz	March 7, 1970	5429
(West Germany) Herbert Swoboda	Mainz	March 6, 1971	5563
(West Germany) Eberhard Stroot	Mainz	March 4, 1972	5716
(West Germany) Guido Kratschmer	West Berlin	February 1, 1976	5724
(West Germany) Guido Kratschmer	West Berlin	January 29, 1978	5860
(Soviet Union) Viktor Gruzenkin	Ordzhonikidze	February 18, 1979	5934
(Soviet Union) Aleksandr Nevskiy	Leningrad	March 2, 1980	6013
(Soviet Union) Aleksandr Nevskiy	Gomel	February 20, 1982	6144
(West Germany) Siegfried Wentz	Dortmund	February 15, 1986	6163
(France) Christian Plaziat	Vittel	February 12, 1989	6241
(France) Christian Plaziat	Nogent-sur-Oise	February 11, 1990	6273
(France) Christian Plaziat	Nogent-sur-Oise	February 2, 1992	6273
(France) Christian Plaziat	Genoa	February 29, 1992	6418
(United States) Dan O'Brien	Toronto	March 14, 1993	6476
(United States) Ashton Eaton	Fayetteville	March 13, 2010	6499
(United States) Ashton Eaton	Tallinn	February 6, 2011	6568
(United States) Ashton Eaton	Istanbul	March 10, 2012	6645
(Switzerland) Simon Ehammer	Toruń	March 21, 2026	6670

== See also ==
- Women's heptathlon world record progression
- Decathlon world record progression
