= 1983 World Championships in Athletics – Men's decathlon =

These are the official results of the men's decathlon competition at the 1983 World Championships in Helsinki, Finland. There were a total number of 25 participating athletes, including seven non-finishers. The competition was held from August 12 to August 13, 1983.

== Medalists ==
| Gold | (United Kingdom) Daley Thompson; Great Britain (GBR) |
| Silver | Jürgen Hingsen; West Germany (FRG) |
| Bronze | Siegfried Wentz; West Germany (FRG) |

== Schedule ==
Friday August 12
1. 100 m
2. Long Jump
3. Shot Put
4. High Jump
5. 400 m

Saturday August 13
6. 110 m hurdles
7. Discus Throw
8. Pole Vault
9. Javelin Throw
10. 1,500 m

== Records ==
Standing records prior to the 1983 World Athletics Championships
| World Record | Jürgen Hingsen (FRG) | 8779 | June 5, 1983 | Filderstadt-Bernhausen, West Germany |
| Event Record | New Event | | | |
| Season Best | Jürgen Hingsen (FRG) | 8779 | June 5, 1983 | Filderstadt-Bernhausen, West Germany |

== Results ==
The highest mark recorded in each event is highlighted in yellow. These marks were split between six competitors with the gold medallist claiming three of them.

| Rank | Athlete | Decathlon | | | | | | | | | | Points |
| Rank | Athlete | 1 | 2 | 3 | 4 | 5 | 6 | 7 | 8 | 9 | 10 | Points |
|---|---|---|---|---|---|---|---|---|---|---|---|---|
| 1st place, gold medalist(s) | Daley Thompson (GBR) | 10.60 | 7.88 | 15.35 | 2.03 | 48.12 | 14.37 | 44.46 | 5.10 | 65.24 | 4:29.72 | 8666 |
| 2nd place, silver medalist(s) | Jurgen Hingsen (FRG) | 10.95 | 7.75 | 15.66 | 2.00 | 48.08 | 14.36 | 43.30 | 4.90 | 67.42 | 4:21.59 | 8561 |
| 3rd place, bronze medalist(s) | Siegfried Wentz (FRG) | 10.94 | 7.24 | 15.11 | 2.00 | 48.09 | 14.13 | 44.98 | 4.70 | 75.08 | 4:28.52 | 8478 |
| 4 | Uwe Freimuth (GDR) | 11.05 | 7.43 | 15.25 | 2.00 | 48.23 | 14.89 | 48.64 | 4.80 | 70.48 | 4:28.61 | 8433 |
| 5 | Stephan Niklaus (SUI) | 10.96 | 7.06 | 14.88 | 2.03 | 48.12 | 15.06 | 48.74 | 4.20 | 73.94 | 4:49.35 | 8212 |
| 6 | Aleksandr Nevskiy (URS) | 11.07 | 7.20 | 14.90 | 2.00 | 49.35 | 14.63 | 49.08 | 4.20 | 64.50 | 4:19.90 | 8201 |
| 7 | Torsten Voss (GDR) | 10.69 | 7.48 | 14.12 | 2.03 | 48.02 | 14.49 | 38.10 | 4.60 | 60.08 | 4:31.19 | 8167 |
| 8 | Steffen Grummt (GDR) | 11.18 | 7.26 | 16.14 | 1.91 | 48.97 | 14.61 | 46.98 | 4.50 | 64.54 | 4:32.56 | 8149 |
| 9 | Guido Kratschmer (FRG) | 10.86 | 7.35 | 14.99 | 1.94 | 48.61 | 14.29 | 46.56 | 4.60 | 52.24 | 4:36.43 | 8096 |
| 10 | Dariusz Ludwig (POL) | 11.17 | 7.29 | 13.77 | 2.00 | 49.84 | 15.33 | 43.90 | 4.70 | 62.00 | 4:26.05 | 7982 |
| 11 | Trond Skramstad (NOR) | 11.20 | 6.90 | 13.53 | 2.00 | 49.13 | 14.90 | 38.18 | 4.50 | 59.78 | 4:18.18 | 7827 |
| 12 | Robert de Wit (NED) | 11.36 | 6.70 | 12.73 | 1.97 | 49.46 | 14.76 | 42.28 | 4.60 | 59.70 | 4:18.92 | 7769 |
| 13 | Martin Machura (TCH) | 11.17 | 7.27 | 14.45 | 2.00 | 50.24 | 16.23 | 48.08 | 4.40 | 56.28 | 4:56.76 | 7639 |
| 14 | Conny Silfver (SWE) | 11.41 | 6.64 | 14.80 | 1.91 | 51.55 | 15.00 | 41.70 | 4.40 | 60.08 | 4:36.94 | 7527 |
| 15 | Thrainn Hafsteinsson (ISL) | 11.73 | 6.53 | 13.80 | 1.82 | 50.47 | 15.81 | 48.58 | 4.10 | 56.28 | 4:22.72 | 7356 |
| 16 | Joško Vlašić (YUG) | 11.55 | 6.99 | 13.33 | 1.85 | 51.01 | 15.01 | 39.28 | 4.00 | 58.46 | 4:29.25 | 7329 |
| 17 | Ángel Díaz (GUA) | 11.65 | 6.37 | 8.98 | 1.91 | 52.01 | 16.15 | 25.70 | 3.50 | 50.90 | 4:29.42 | 6239 |
| 18 | Niulolo Pelesikoti (TGA) | 11.80 | 6.47 | 10.76 | 1.67 | 53.13 | 16.65 | 33.70 | 3.40 | NM | 5:08.32 | 5332 |
| — | Harri Sundell (FIN) | 11.11 | 7.23 | 13.95 | 2.06 | 49.49 | 14.72 | 42.10 | 4.30 | NM | DNS | DNF |
| — | Claudio Escauriza (PAR) | 11.41 | 6.77 | 13.23 | 1.85 | 52.98 | 17.77 | 38.74 | 4.00 | DNS | | DNF |
| — | John Crist (USA) | 11.42 | 6.76 | 12.89 | 1.88 | 51.67 | DNF | 42.02 | DNS | | | DNF |
| — | Konstantin Akhapkin (URS) | 11.02 | 7.44 | 13.73 | 1.94 | 49.43 | DNF | DNS | | | | DNF |
| — | Grigoriy Degtyaryev (URS) | 11.01 | 7.41 | 15.03 | NM | DNS | | | | | | DNF |
| — | Mark Anderson (USA) | 11.39 | 6.83 | 13.61 | DNS | | | | | | | DNF |
| — | Bacha Ahmed Mahour (ALG) | 11.64 | 6.69 | NM | DNS | | | | | | | DNF |

== See also ==
- 1980 Men's Olympic Decathlon (Moscow)
- 1982 Men's European Championships Decathlon (Athens)
- 1984 Men's Olympic Decathlon (Los Angeles)
