= Decathlon world record progression =

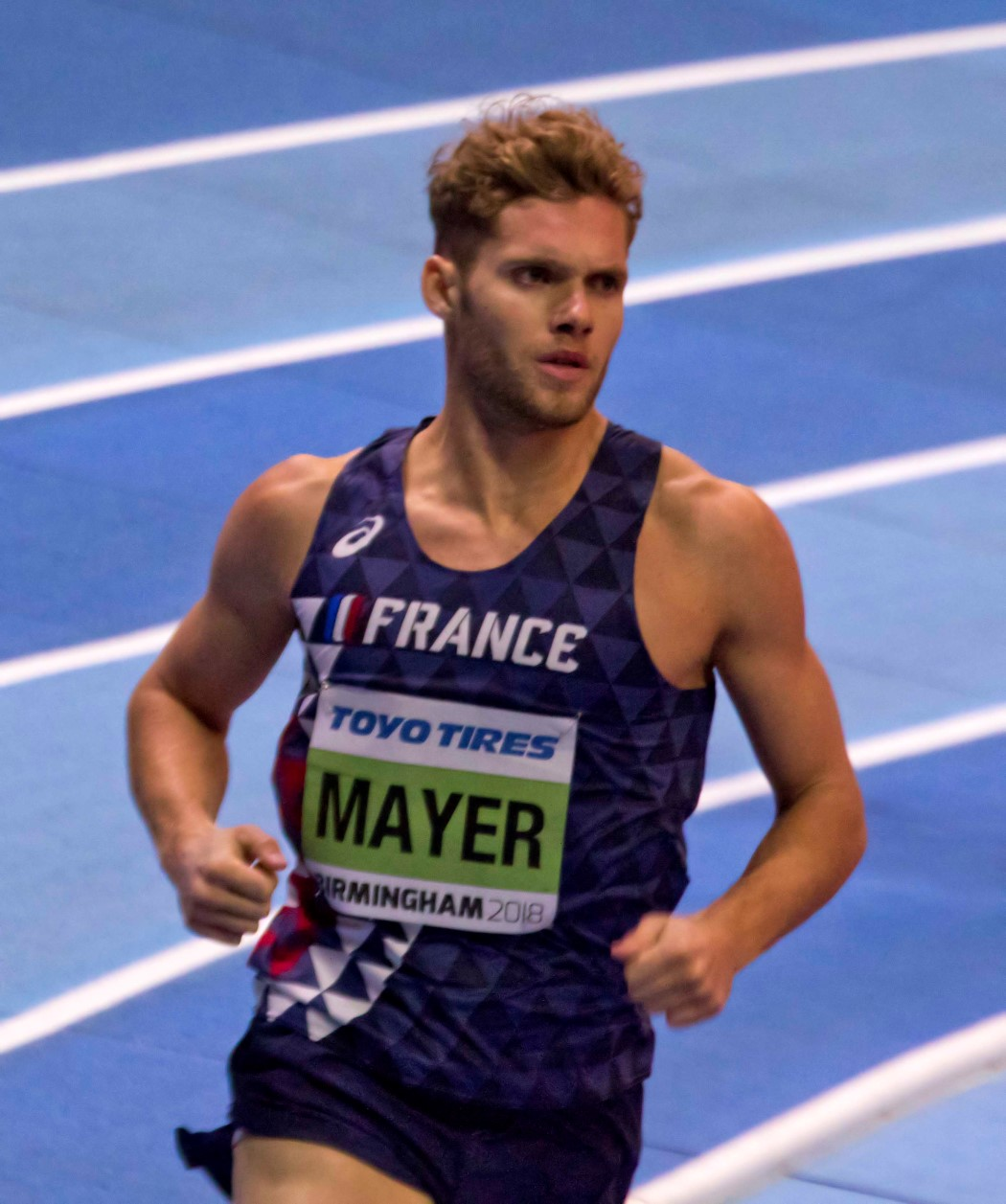
The current men's world record holder Kevin Mayer.

The first world record in the decathlon was recognized by the International Association of Athletics Federations in 1922.

As of 23 June 2012, 36 men's world records have been ratified by the IAAF in the event. The current world record holder is French national Kevin Mayer with 9126 points. Over the years, athletes have become bigger, stronger and faster, technique and equipment especially in pole vault has rapidly increased, leading some to score more points.

The first world record in the women's decathlon was recognized by the IAAF in 2004. As of 21 June 2009, two world records have been ratified by the IAAF in the event.

== Records ==
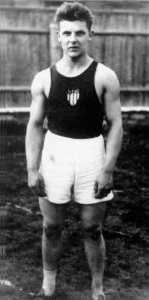
Estonian Aleksander Klumberg was the first official record holder.

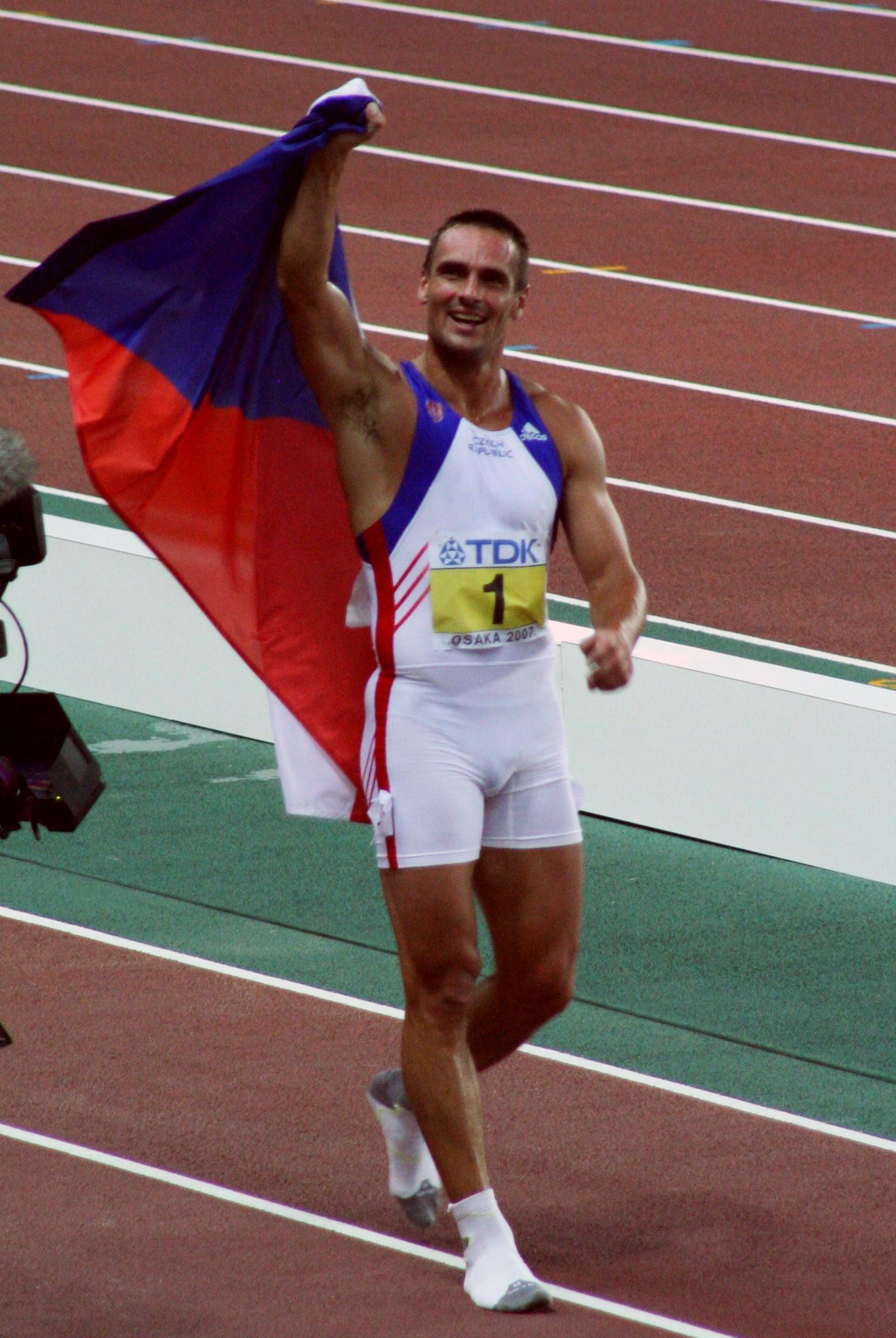
Roman Šebrle was the first man to score over 9,000 points.

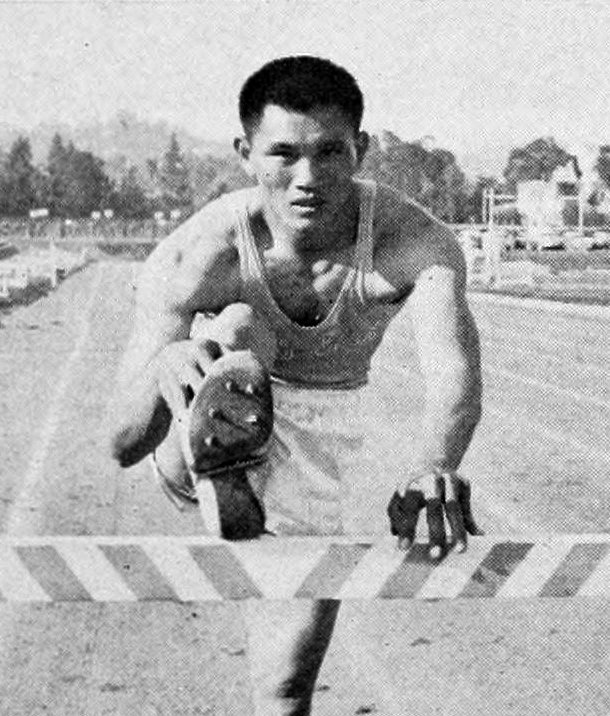
Yang Chuan-kwang was the first and, so far, only decathlon world record holder from outside Europe and the United States.

=== Men ===
Points (Note: Score calculated with the scoring tables in use at the time the record was set.)	Adjusted points (Note: Score calculated with the current (1998) tables.)	Athlete	Nation	Date	Place	Ref.
7,485.61	6,087	Aleksander Klumberg	EST	1922-09-22	Helsinki	
7,710.775	6,476	Harold Osborn	USA	1924-07-12	Paris	
7,820.93	6,460	Paavo Yrjölä	FIN	1926-07-18	Viipuri	
7,995.19	6,566	Paavo Yrjölä	FIN	1927-07-17	Helsinki	
8,053.29	6,587	Paavo Yrjölä	FIN	1928-08-04	Amsterdam	
8,255.475	6,865	Akilles Järvinen	FIN	1930-07-20	Viipuri	
8,462.235	6,736	James Bausch	USA	1932-08-06	Los Angeles	
8,790.46	7,147	Hans-Heinrich Sievert	GER	1934-07-08	Hamburg	
7,900	7,254	Glenn Morris	USA	1936-08-08	Berlin	
8,042	7,287	Bob Mathias	USA	1950-06-30	Tulare	
7,887	7,592	Bob Mathias	USA	1952-07-26	Helsinki	
7,985	7,608	Rafer Johnson	USA	1955-06-11	Kingsburg	
8,014	7,653	Vasili Kuznetsov	URS	1958-05-18	Krasnodar	
8,302	7,989	Rafer Johnson	USA	1958-07-28	Moscow	
8,357	7,839	Vasili Kuznetsov	URS	1959-05-17	Moscow	
8,683	7,981	Rafer Johnson	USA	1960-07-09	Eugene	
9,121	8,010	Yang Chuan-kwang	ROC	1963-04-28	Walnut	
8,230	8,120	Russ Hodge	USA	1966-07-24	Los Angeles	
8,319	8,235	Kurt Bendlin	FRG	1967-05-14	Heidelberg	
8,417	8,310	Bill Toomey	USA	1969-12-11	Los Angeles	
8,454	8,466	Mykola Avilov	URS	1972-09-08	Munich	
8,524	8,420	Bruce Jenner	USA	1975-08-10	Eugene	
8,538	8,454	Bruce Jenner	USA	1976-06-26	Eugene	
8,618	8,634	Bruce Jenner	USA	1976-07-30	Montreal	
8,622	8,648	Daley Thompson	GBR	1980-05-15	Götzis	
8,649	8,667	Guido Kratschmer	FRG	1980-06-14	Filderstadt-Bernhausen	
8,704	8,730	Daley Thompson	GBR	1982-05-23	Götzis	
8,723	8,741	Jürgen Hingsen	FRG	1982-08-15	Ulm	
8,743	8,774	Daley Thompson	GBR	1982-09-08	Athens	
8,779	8,825	Jürgen Hingsen	FRG	1983-06-05	Filderstadt-Bernhausen	
8,798	8,832	Jürgen Hingsen	FRG	1984-06-09	Mannheim	
8,798 (Note: Originally recorded as 8,797 points and thus not a world record using the then-current 1962 tables. Based on the revised tables which took effect in April 1985, Thompson's Los Angeles performance would have scored more than Hingsen's Mannheim performance (8,846 to 8,832) but the IAAF had decreed the pre-revision record could only be broken by a mark set after the changeover. In 1986, Thompson's 110 metres hurdles time was revised from 14.34 to 14.33 and his score increased by one point, so he retrospectively joined Hingsen as record holder under the old tables and replaced him from the date of the new tables.)	8,847	Daley Thompson	GBR	1984-08-09	Los Angeles	
8,891	8,891	Dan O'Brien	USA	1992-09-05	Talence	
8,994	8,994	Tomáš Dvořák	CZE	1999-07-04	Prague	
9,026	9,026	Roman Šebrle	CZE	2001-05-27	Götzis	
9,039	9,039	Ashton Eaton	USA	2012-06-23	Eugene	
9,045	9,045	Ashton Eaton	USA	2015-08-29	Beijing	
9,126	9,126	Kevin Mayer	FRA	2018-09-16	Talence	

=== Women ===
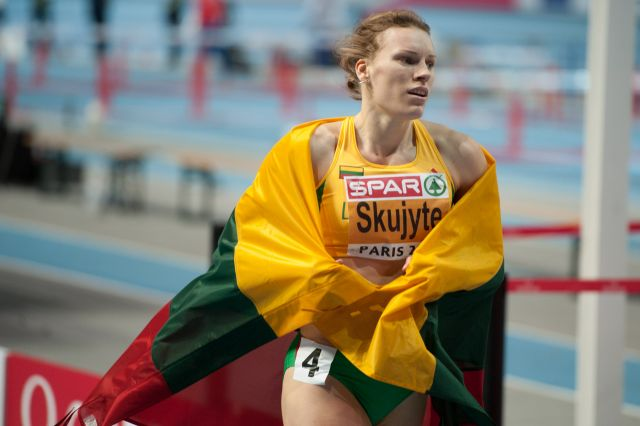
Austra Skujytė – the current women's decathlon world record holder.

Points	Athlete	Nation	Date	Place
8,150	Marie Collonvillé	FRA	2004-09-26	Talence
8,358	Austra Skujytė	LTU	2005-04-15	Columbia, Missouri
