= Zhelanov (surname) =

Zhelanov (Russian: Желанов) is a Russian surname. Notable people with the surname include:

- Mikhail Zhelanov (born 1964), Russian footballer and manager
- Sergey Zhelanov (born 1957), Soviet athlete
