= Lapta =

Lapta may refer to:

- Lapta (game), a Russian sport
- Lapta Türk Birliği S.K., a sports club in Lapithos, Cyprus
- Lapithos, a village in Cyprus
