= 1985 Hypo-Meeting =

The 11th edition of the annual Hypo-Meeting took place on May 25 and May 26, 1985 in Götzis, Austria. The track and field competition featured a decathlon (men) and a heptathlon (women) event.

== Men's Decathlon ==
=== Schedule ===
May 25
1. 100 m
2. Long Jump
3. Shot Put
4. High Jump
5. 400 m

May 26
6. 110 m hurdles
7. Discus Throw
8. Pole Vault
9. Javelin Throw
10. 1,500 m

=== Records ===
World Record	Daley Thompson (GBR)	8847	August 9, 1984	Los Angeles, United States
Event Record	Daley Thompson (GBR)	8730	May 23, 1982	Götzis, Austria

=== Results ===
Rank	Athlete	Decathlon										Points
Rank	Athlete	1	2	3	4	5	6	7	8	9	10	Points
1	Uwe Freimuth (GDR)	11,14	7.50	16.26	1.96	48,79	14,69	47.50	4.90	69.86	4:32.13	8473
2	Torsten Voss (GDR)	10,59	7.72	14.59	2.11	48,30	14,23	42.72	5.00	59.02	4:50.41	8424
3	Aleksandr Nevskiy (URS)	10,95	7.35	14.99	2.08	49,29	14,76	46.12	4.60	68.16	4:21.09	8409
4	Dave Steen (CAN)	11,21	7.47	12.53	2.11	47,58	15,10	42.08	5.10	60.16	4:19.87	8253
5	Christian Schenk (GDR)	11,21	7.61	15.20	2.20	49,09	15,02	40.20	4.00	66.48	4:26.57	8163
6	Ulf Behrendt (GDR)	10,99	7.15	15.90	1.96	48,20	15,81	47.38	4.20	57.94	4:23.13	7964
7	Frédéric Sacco (FRA)	11,22	7.34	15.98	1.96	50,82	15,22	43.86	4.70	55.82	4:42.24	7828
8	Michael Neugebauer (FRG)	11,01	7.23	12.16	2.08	48,79	14,28	41.44	4.20	56.60	4:33.35	7808
9	Roland Marloye (BEL)	11,02	7.46	12.95	2.02	49,75	14,18	42.52	4.20	56.06	4:43.64	7770
10	Eugene Gilkes (GBR)	10,75	7.10	13.98	1.90	46,91	15,44	39.90	4.30	47.94	4:12.82	7740
11	Janusz Leśniewicz (POL)	11,23	7.16	13.80	2.02	49,29	15,05	40.36	4.50	57.46	4:35.73	7730
12	Cecko Mitrakiyev (BUL)	11,27	7.11	14.15	1.96	50,50	15,25	41.00	4.40	58.28	4:21.88	7685
13	Andrzej Wyżykowski (POL)	11,05	6.69	13.81	1.96	49,65	14,76	44.16	4.00	67.16	4:52.77	7600
14	Thomas Rizzi (FRG)	10,65	7.09	14.70	1.96	47,93	16,09	39.96	4.00	51.96	4:32.17	7578
15	Roman Hrabáň (TCH)	11,14	7.06	15.35	1.93	50,03	15,73	45.76	4.50	55.66	5:05.67	7529
16	Holger Schmidt (FRG)	10,91	7.04	15.25	1.99	49,75	15,00	44.96	4.00	54.10	5:19.07	7466
17	Jürgen Mandl (AUT)	11,13	7.09	13.10	1.96	49,89	14,56	35.46	4.20	56.30	4:48.17	7388
18	Armin Spörri (SUI)	11,46	7.09	14.00	1.99	51,74	15,34	43.44	3.80	57.18	4:33.91	7375
19	Ivan Krastev (BUL)	11,39	7.04	14.46	1.99	51,79	15,55	43.94	4.30	52.46	4:48.68	7367
20	Marc Kemp (LUX)	11,14	7.18	11.51	1.93	49,80	15,62	39.02	4.50	56.82	4:43.25	7359
21	Wolfgang Spann (AUT)	11.46	6.70	14.45	1.81	51.23	15.04	38.66	4.00	68.74	4:43.84	7280
23	József Hoffer (HUN)	11,55	6.68	14.44	1.90	51,75	15,61	42.92	4.20	64.38	4:53.86	7260
23	Martin Machura (TCH)	11,09	6.91	15.30	1.96	50,44	16,99	44.86	4.40	53.92	5:12.62	7258
24	Kevin Atkinson (IRL)	11.10	7.43	12.39	1.87	49.16	15.67	32.38	4.10	53.70	4:32.08	7228
25	Piet van Vaerenbergh (BEL)	11.16	6.78	13.60	1.84	49.66	16.40	43.60	4.00	45.18	4:23.75	7129
26	Věroslav Valenta (TCH)	11,59	6.51	13.68	1.90	50,93	15,28	42.36	4.40	44.76	4:42.37	7065
27	Jan-Erik Romar (FIN)	11,61	6.78	12.71	1.93	52,79	14,96	37.66	4.70	48.94	4:59.80	6997
28	Sergey Pugach (URS)	11,33	7.09	14.28	2.02	49,09	14,85	44.70	—	48.02	4:33.42	6958
—	Siegfried Wentz (FRG)	10,99	7.39	15.20	2.08	47,66	14,26	46.10	—	66.86	—	DNF
—	Philipp Eder (AUT)	11.35	6.47	12.51	1.84	50.26	15.78	38.12	4.00	52.54	DNS	DNF

== Women's Heptathlon ==
=== Schedule ===
May 25
1. 100 m hurdles
2. High Jump
3. Shot Put
4. 200 m

May 26
5. Long Jump
6. Javelin Throw
7. 800 m

=== Records ===
World Record	Sabine John (GDR)	6946	May 6, 1984	Potsdam, East Germany
Event Record	Natalya Shubenkova (URS)	6517	May 29, 1983	Götzis, Austria

=== Results ===
Rank	Athlete	Heptathlon							Points
Rank	Athlete	1	2	3	4	5	6	7	Points
	Nancy Vallecilla (ECU)	13.84	1.78	11.32	24.64	6.05	37.18	2:10.51	5925
