= Mohamed Mansour =

Mohamed Mansour can refer to:

- Mohamed Mansour (businessman) (born 1948), Egyptian billionaire businessman with the Mansour Group
- Mohamed Mansour (athlete), Libyan athlete
- Mohamed Mansour Hassan, Egyptian businessman and senior member of the Democratic Front Party
- Mohamed Mansour Salah (born 1957), a Qatari athlete
- Mohammed Mansour Jabarah (born 1981), a Kuwaiti terrorist
- Mohamed Moukrim Ben Mansour (born 1938), Moroccan Olympic wrestler
