= Razvigor Yankov =

Bulgarian decathlete

Personal information
- Nationality: Bulgarian
- Born: 10 April 1954 (age 70); Plovdiv, Bulgaria

Sport
- Sport: Athletics
- Event: Decathlon

Razvigor Yankov (born 10 April 1954) is a Bulgarian athlete. He competed in the men's decathlon at the 1980 Summer Olympics.
