= Siegfried Stark =

East German decathlete

Medal record

Men's athletics

Representing East Germany

European Championships
Bronze medal – third place	1978 Prague	Decathlon
Bronze medal – third place	1982 Athens	Decathlon

Siegfried Stark (born 12 June 1955 in Rehna, Mecklenburg-Vorpommern) is a retired East German decathlete.

He won the bronze medals at the European Championships in 1978 and 1982. At the Olympic Games he finished sixth in 1976 and did not finish in 1980.

He became East German champion in the decathlon in 1976 and 1977, representing the club SC Traktor Schwerin.

His personal best was 8534 points, achieved in May 1980 in Halle. This ranks him eighth among German decathletes, behind Jürgen Hingsen, Uwe Freimuth, Siegfried Wentz, Frank Busemann, Torsten Voss, Guido Kratschmer and Paul Meier.
