= Harthausen, Baden-Württemberg =

Coordinates: 48°38′54″N 9°14′51″E

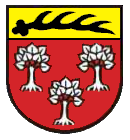
Coat of arms of the former municipality.

Harthausen is a former municipality in the Esslingen district, in Baden-Württemberg, Germany.

It was first recorded in year 1304 as Harthusen.

In 1975 it was merged with the municipalities Bernhausen, Bonlanden, Plattenhardt, Sielmingen and Harthausen to form the new town Filderstadt. Harthausen is today a quartier of that town, formally named Filderstadt-Harthausen. It has 4,094 inhabitants.
