= Athletics at the 1982 Commonwealth Games – Men's decathlon =

Men's decathlon at the Commonwealth Games

The men's decathlon event at the 1982 Commonwealth Games was held on 4 and 5 October at the QE II Stadium in Brisbane, Australia.

== Results ==
The highest mark recorded in each event is highlighted in yellow

Rank	Athlete	Nationality	100m	LJ	SP	HJ	400m	110m H	DT	PV	JT	1500m	Points	Notes
1st place, gold medalist(s)	Daley Thompson	England	10.66	7.71	15.17	2.04	47.59	15.00	44.58	4.90	62.98	4:43.48	8410	
2nd place, silver medalist(s)	Dave Steen	Canada	11.39	7.30	13.36	1.98	48.71	15.52	42.96	4.80	67.20	4:24.21	8004	
3rd place, bronze medalist(s)	Fidelis Obikwu	England	11.50	7.05	14.62	2.07	50.17	16.46	42.32	4.60	58.92	4:30.44	7726	
4	Peter Hadfield	Australia	11.18	7.45	13.70	1.83	49.27	15.61	44.54	4.30	50.94	4:44.46	7511	
5	Peter Dyer	New Zealand	11.42	6.96	11.92	1.83	49.38	16.38	41.76	4.30	59.20	4:28.99	7316	
6	Charles Kokoyo	Kenya	11.41	7.08	12.00	1.89	49.47	14.51	37.72	3.10	57.80	4:35.57	7118	
7	Greg Haydenluck	Canada	11.42	6.44	11.51	1.83	49.41	19.52	42.32	4.00	48.40	4:23.85	6766	
8	Colin Boreham	Northern Ireland	11.44	6.98	13.58	2.01	49.60	15.21	41.38	NM	51.46	4:23.92	6727	
9	Panayiotis Zeniou	Cyprus	11.59	6.69	13.96	1.86	51.76	16.29	39.74	NM	59.82	4:43.82	6273	
10	Cornelius Kemboi	Kenya	11.65	5.90	11.95	1.59	52.20	17.44	39.28	2.70	67.14	4:32.56	6176	
11	Samuela Tabua	Fiji	11.79	5.71	11.23	1.83	52.99	17.15	25.58	3.00	52.50	4:41.92	5819	
	Sanitesi Latu	Tonga	11.50	6.62	15.07	1.83	54.21	15.38	46.10	NM	DNS	–	DNF	
	Chris Nunn	Australia	11.24	7.16	11.99	1.89	51.05	15.95	DNS	–	–	–	DNF	
	James Middleton	Australia	11.42	4.76	DNS	–	–	–	–	–	–	–	DNF	
	Brad McStravick	Scotland	11.27	DNS	–	–	–	–	–	–	–	–	DNF	
