= Aleksandr Nevskiy (athlete) =

Soviet decathlete

Aleksandr Nevskiy (Russian: Александр Невский; born 21 February 1958) is a retired male decathlete from the Soviet Union. He set his personal best (8476 points) when finishing as runner-up at the annual Hypo-Meeting in Götzis on 20 May 1984. He took part in the World Championships in Athletics on two occasions, with his best result of sixth place coming at the inaugural event in 1983.

== Achievements ==
Year	Competition	Venue	Position	Notes
Representing Soviet Union
1983	World Championships	Helsinki, Finland	6th	Decathlon
1984	Hypo-Meeting	Götzis, Austria	2nd	Decathlon
1985	Hypo-Meeting	Götzis, Austria	3rd	Decathlon
1986	Hypo-Meeting	Götzis, Austria	7th	Decathlon
1987	World Championships	Rome, Italy	8th	Decathlon

== See also ==
- Men's heptathlon world record progression

Records
Preceded by (Soviet Union) Viktor Gruzenkin	Men's heptathlon world record holder 18 February 1979 – 15 February 1986	Succeeded by (West Germany) Siegfried Wentz
