= Plattenhardt =

Quarter of Filderstadt, Baden-Württemberg, Germany

Coordinates: 48°39′N 9°12′E

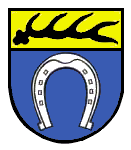
Coat of arms of the former municipality

Plattenhardt is a former municipality in the Esslingen district, in Baden-Württemberg, Germany. It was first recorded in year 1269 as Blatinhart.

In 1975 it was merged with the municipalities Bernhausen, Bonlanden, Sielmingen and Harthausen to form the new town Filderstadt. Plattenhardt is today a quarter of Filderstadt, formally named Filderstadt-Plattenhardt. It has 8,482 inhabitants and is located 27 km from Stuttgart.

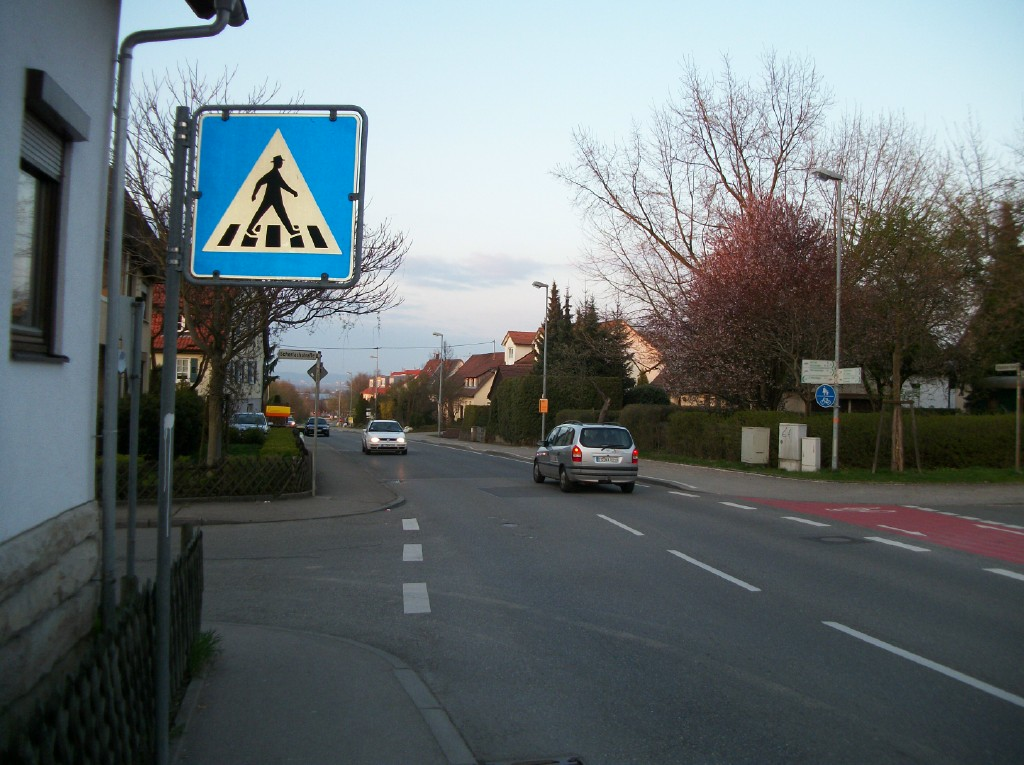
A road in Plattenhardt

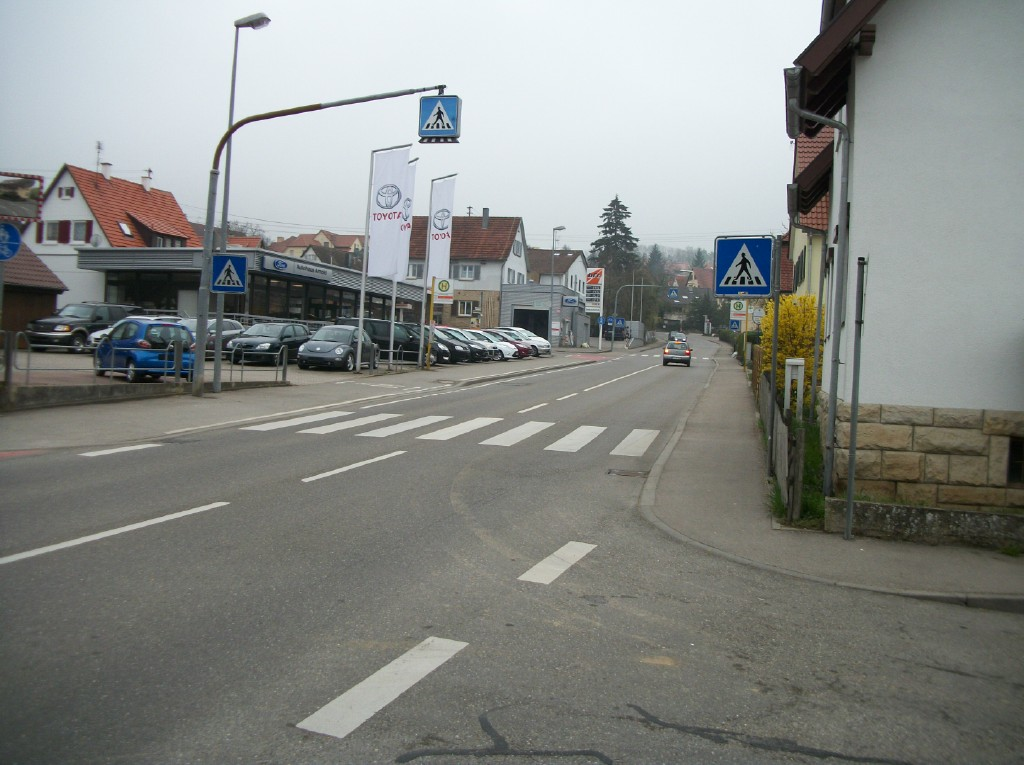
A car dealer in Plattenhardt

== Sources ==
- Das Land Baden-Württemberg – Amtliche Beschreibung nach Kreisen und Gemeinden. Band III Regierungsbezirk Stuttgart, Region Mittlerer Neckar (ed. Landesarchivdirektion Baden-Württemberg). Kohlhammer Verlag: Stuttgart 1978 ISBN 3-17-004758-2
- Nikolaus Back: Von Filderlinden nach Filderstadt. Die Gemeindereform von 1975. Stadt Filderstadt 2000 ISBN 3-934760-01-5
- Der Landkreis Esslingen (ed. Landesarchiv Baden-Württemberg with the Landkreis Esslingen), Band I, p. 519. Jan Thorbecke Verlag: Ostfildern 2009. ISBN 978-3-7995-0842-1
