= Sielmingen =

Coordinates: 48°40′N 9°14′E

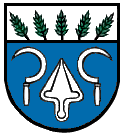
Coat of arms of the former municipality.

Sielmingen is a former municipality in the Esslingen district, in Baden-Württemberg, Germany.

It was first recorded in year 1275 as Sygehelmingen.

In 1975 it was merged with the municipalities Bernhausen, Bonlanden, Plattenhardt and Harthausen to form the new town Filderstadt. Sielmingen is today a quartier of that town, formally named Filderstadt-Sielmingen. It has 7,566 inhabitants.
