= Janusz Szczerkowski =

Polish decathlete

Personal information
- Nationality: Polish
- Born: 9 May 1954 (age 70); Bydgoszcz, Poland

Sport
- Sport: Athletics
- Event: Decathlon

Janusz Szczerkowski (born 9 May 1954) is a Polish athlete. He competed in the men's decathlon at the 1980 Summer Olympics.
