= Viktor Gruzenkin =

Retired Soviet decathlete

Viktor Gruzenkin (sometimes spelled Viktor Grouzenkin) (born December 19, 1951) is a retired Soviet decathlete. His personal record in the decathlon is 8356 points, set in Kiev in 1984. On February 17–18, 1979 he set the world record in the Indoor Heptathlon at 5934 points, which he held for over a year, surpassing the record of Guido Kratschmer who had recently won the silver medal in the 1976 Olympics behind Bruce Jenner (now known as Caitlyn Jenner). (Note: Jenner changed her name due to gender transition in 2015.)

He continued competing into the Masters division, winning the decathlon in the M45 division at the 1997 World Championships. His 7687 points from that meet is the current World Record.

In 1978 he had a leading role in the film Muzhskie Igry Na Svezhem Vozdukhe (roughly translated as "Men's Outdoor Play").

== Personal bests ==
Event	Performance	Location	Date
100 metres	10.92 (+0.7)	Kiev	June 21, 1984
Long jump	7.67 m (25 ft 1 3/4 in) (-0.2)	Kiev	June 21, 1984
Shot put	15.98 m (52 ft 5 in)	Kiev	June 21, 1984
High jump	2.09 m (6 ft 10 1/4 in)	Moscow	June 18, 1983
400 metres	50.06	Kiev	June 21, 1984
110 metres hurdles	14.65 (+0.3)	Kiev	June 22, 1984
Discus throw	47.06 m (154 ft 4 3/4 in)	Moscow	June 19, 1983
Pole vault	4.80 m (15 ft 8 3/4 in)	Moscow	June 19, 1983
1500 metres	4:40.49	Moscow	June 19, 1983
Decathlon	8356	Kiev	June 21–22, 1984
