= Runald Beckman =

Swedish athlete (born 1951)

Personal information
- Nationality: Swedish
- Born: 5 July 1951 (age 74) Luleå, Sweden

Sport
- Sport: Athletics
- Event: Decathlon

Runald Beckman (born 5 July 1951), also known as Runald Backman, is a Swedish former athlete. He competed in the men's decathlon at the 1976 Summer Olympics. He also competed in the four-man bobsleigh at the 1980 Winter Olympics.

Competing for the BYU Cougars track and field team, Beckman won the 1974 NCAA Division I Outdoor Track and Field Championships in the decathlon.

As an athlete, Beckman represented IFK Luleå, and as a bobsledder, he represented Djurgårdens IF.

== See also ==
- List of athletes who competed in both the Summer and Winter Olympic games
