= Heikki Leppänen =

Finnish decathlete

Personal information
- Nationality: Finnish
- Born: 31 August 1946 (age 79) Tampere, Finland

Sport
- Sport: Athletics
- Event: Decathlon

Heikki Leppänen (born 31 August 1946) is a Finnish athlete. He competed in the men's decathlon at the 1976 Summer Olympics.
