= Bonlanden =

Coordinates: 48.652897°N 9.217914°E

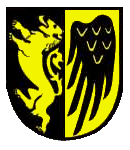
Coat of arms of the former municipality.

Bonlanden is a former municipality in the Esslingen district, in Baden-Württemberg, Germany.

It was first recorded in the 12th century as Bonlandum.

In 1975 it was merged with the municipalities Bernhausen, Plattenhardt, Sielmingen and Harthausen to form the new town Filderstadt. Bonlanden is today a quartier of Filderstadt, formally named Filderstadt-Bonlanden. It has 10,296 inhabitants.
