= Dariusz Ludwig =

Polish decathlete

Dariusz Ludwig (born 25 February 1955 in Siemiatycze, Podlaskie) is a retired male decathlete from Poland. A member of Bałtyk Gdynia, he set his personal best (8222 points) on 12 July 1981 at a meet in Brussels.

== Achievements ==
Year	Competition	Venue	Position	Notes
Representing Poland
1980	Olympic Games	Moscow, Soviet Union	6th	Decathlon
1982	European Championships	Athens, Greece	DNF	Decathlon
1983	World Championships	Helsinki, Finland	10th	Decathlon
