= Philippe Bobin =

French decathlete

Personal information
- Nationality: French
- Born: 24 January 1955 (age 71) Paris, France

Sport
- Sport: Athletics
- Event: Decathlon
Medal record
Representing France
Summer Universiade
Silver medal – second place	1975 Rome	Decathlon

Philippe Bobin (born 24 January 1955) is a French athlete. He competed in the men's decathlon at the 1976 Summer Olympics.
