= Gilles Gémise-Fareau =

French decathlete

Personal information
- Nationality: French
- Born: 27 August 1953 (age 71)

Sport
- Sport: Athletics
- Event: Decathlon

Gilles Gémise-Fareau (born 27 August 1953) is a French athlete. He competed in the men's decathlon at the 1976 Summer Olympics.
