= Sandro Brogini =

Italian decathlete

Personal information
- Full name: Alessandro Brogini
- Nationality: Italian
- Born: 20 December 1958 (age 67) La Spezia
- Height: 1.70 m (5 ft 7 in)
- Weight: 68 kg (150 lb)

Sport
- Country: Italy
- Sport: Athletics
- Events: Decathlon; High jump
- Club: Cassa di Risparmio della Spezia

Achievements and titles
- Personal bests: Decathlon: 7644 pts (1990); High jump: 2.18 m (1976)
Medal record
European Junior Championships
Bronze medal – third place	1977 Donetsk	High jump

Sandro Brogini (born 20 December 1958) was an Italian decathlete (before was high jumper at a young level), who competed at the 1980 Summer Olympics,

== Biography ==
He was an young promise, just international youth medalist, attended a 22-year Olympic edition, failing to maintain expectations during his senior career.

== Personal best ==
- Decathlon: 7644 pts ( (Denmark) Lyngby, 22 June 1980)
  - 100 m: 11.22, long jump: 7.27 m, shot put: 12.95 m, high jump: 2.09 m, 400 m: 51.39;
  - 110 m hs: 14.90, discus throw: 41.82 m, pole vault: 4.30 m, javelin throw: 56.10 m, 1500 m: 4:23.00

== National records ==
- Decathlon: 7644 pts ( (Denmark) Lyngby, 22 June 1980). Record held until 19 June 1988 (broken by Marco Rossi)

== Olympic race ==
Decathlon at Moscow 1980
Day 1
100 m	Long jump	Shot put	High jump	400 m	Half race
11.41; 708 pts	7.33 m 887 pts	13.02; 666 pts	2.06 m 909 pts	50.97; 762 pts	15th 3932 pts
Day 2
110 m hs	Discus throw	Pole vault	Javelin throw	1500 m	Final standings
15.21; 826 pts	39.54 m 676 pts	NM	DNS	DNS	DNF

== National titles ==
- Italian Athletics Championships
  - Decathlon: 1979, 1981
