= Claus Marek =

German decathlete

Personal information
- Nationality: German
- Born: 3 April 1954 (age 70); Bochum, West Germany

Sport
- Sport: Athletics
- Event: Decathlon

Claus Marek (born 3 April 1954) is a German athlete. He competed in the men's decathlon at the 1976 Summer Olympics.
