= Vivian Coralie =

Mauritian athlete

Personal information
- Nationality: Mauritian
- Born: 11 March 1962 (age 63)

Sport
- Sport: Athletics
- Event: Decathlon

Vivian Coralie (born 11 March 1962) is a Mauritian athlete. He competed in the men's decathlon at the 1984 Summer Olympics.
