= Esa Jokinen =

Finnish decathlete

Esa Antero Jokinen (born February 19, 1958, in Kuusankoski) is a retired male decathlete from Finland, who was nicknamed "Diesel" during his career. He set his personal best (7868 points) in 1980.

Jokinen was a Finnish national champion in athletics. He was an All-American for the BYU Cougars track and field team, finishing 7th in the decathlon at the 1979 NCAA Division I Outdoor Track and Field Championships.

== Achievements ==
Year	Competition	Venue	Position	Notes
Representing Finland
1980	Olympic Games	Moscow, Soviet Union	9th	7826 points
