= Monassar Mohamed Saleh =

Qatari decathlete

Personal information
- Nationality: Qatari
- Born: 1957 (age 67–68)

Sport
- Sport: Athletics
- Event: Decathlon

Monassar Mohamed Saleh (Arabic: منصر محمد صالح; born 1957) is a Qatari athlete. He competed in the men's decathlon at the 1984 Summer Olympics.
