= Aleksandr Grebenyuk =

Soviet decathlete

Medal record

Men's athletics

Representing Soviet Union

European Championships
Gold medal – first place	1978 Prague	Decathlon

Aleksandr Grebenyuk (Russian: Александр Гребенюк; born 22 May 1951 in Zelenokumsk, Stavropol Kray) is a retired decathlete from the Soviet Union. He set the best world's year performance in 1977, collecting 8400 points at a meet in Riga on 3 July 1977. He won the European title in 1978, and collected three Soviet titles (1977, 1978 and 1979). His cousin is Ekaterina Grebenyuk, future physician.

== Achievements ==
Year	Competition	Venue	Position	Notes
Representing Soviet Union
1976	Olympic Games	Montreal, Quebec, Canada	9th	Decathlon
1976	Décastar	Talence, France	1st	Decathlon
1978	European Championships	Prague, Czechoslovakia	1st	Decathlon
