= Filderstadt =

- Town
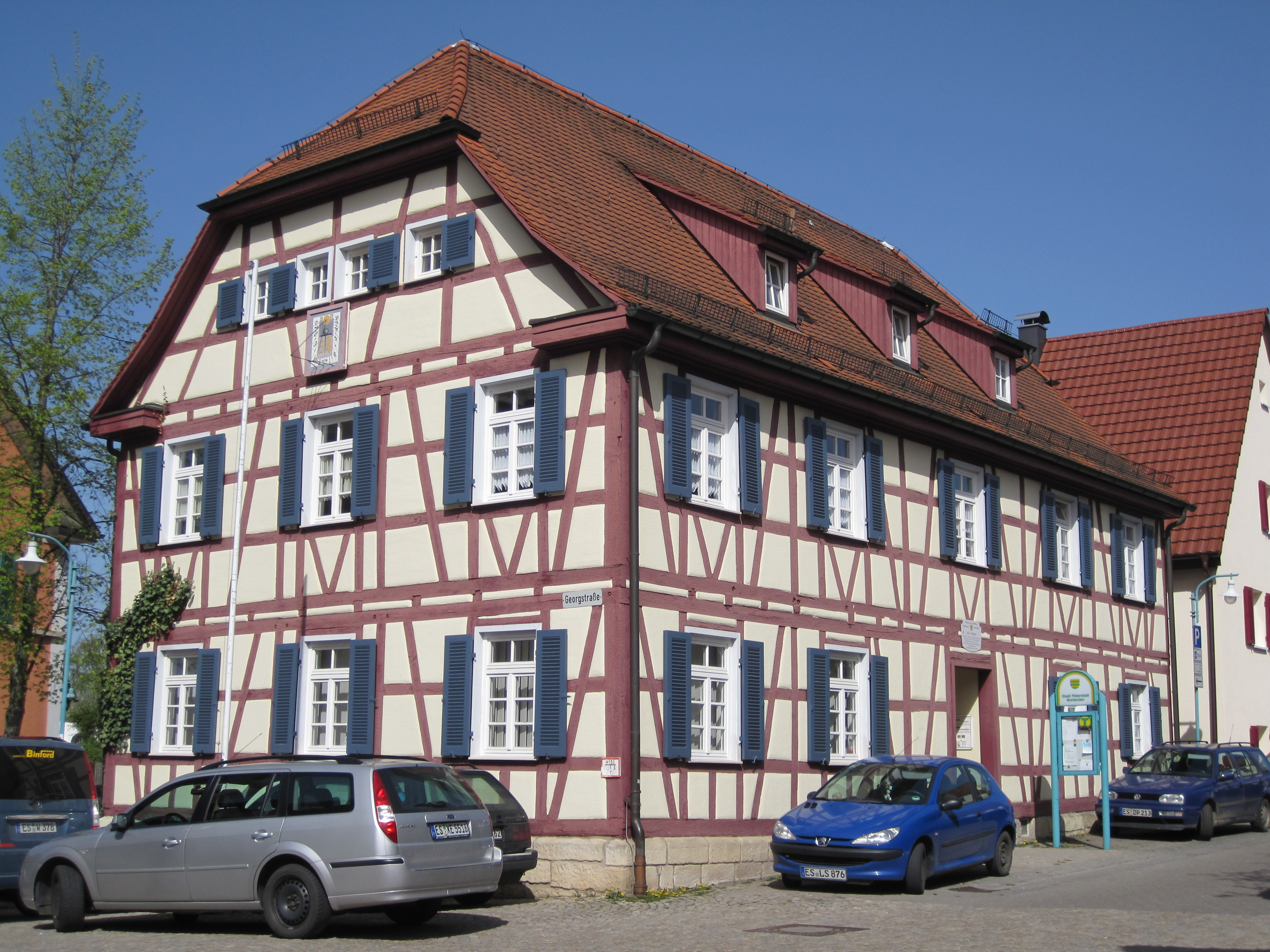
- Old school in Filderstadt-Bonlanden

- Coat of arms

- Location of Filderstadt within Esslingen district
- Interactive map of Filderstadt
- Location within Germany Location within Baden-Württemberg
- Coordinates: 48°40′49″N 9°13′6″E
- Country: Germany
- State: Baden-Württemberg
- Admin. region: Stuttgart
- District: Esslingen

Government
  - Mayor (2023–31): Christoph Traub (CDU)

Area
  - Total: 38.55 km^{2} (14.88 sq mi)
- Elevation: 371 m (1,217 ft)

Population (2025-12-31)
  - Total: 46,274
  - Density: 1,200/km^{2} (3,109/sq mi)
- Time zone: UTC+01:00 (CET)
  - Summer (DST): UTC+02:00 (CEST)
- Postal codes: 70794
- Dialling codes: 0711 and 07158
- Vehicle registration: ES
- Website: www.filderstadt.de

Filderstadt (German pronunciation: [ˈfɪldɐˌʃtat]; Swabian: Fildorsdadd) is a town in the district of Esslingen in Baden-Württemberg in southern Germany. It is located approximately 13 km south of Stuttgart.

Filderstadt is located next to the Stuttgart Airport and the new Trade Fair. Line S2 of the Stuttgart S-Bahn terminates at Filderstadt station.

Filderstadt was created as a town in 1975 from five smaller villages called Bernhausen, Bonlanden, Plattenhardt, Sielmingen and Harthausen.

From 1978 to 2005, it played host to the Porsche Tennis Grand Prix, a WTA Tier II event.

Princess Claire of Luxembourg was born here on 21 March 1985.

German writer Michael Ende, author of The Neverending Story, died in Filderstadt in 1995.

== Economy ==
Contact Air once had its headquarters in Filderstadt.

== Politics ==
The most recent mayoral election was held on 5 Juli 2015, and the results were as follows:

Candidate	Party	Votes	%
Christoph Traub	Christian Democratic Union	6,826	51.0
Gabriele Dönig-Poppensieker	Independent	4,403	32.9
Georg Müller	Christian Democratic Union	1,867	13.9
Joachim Thier-Ueltzen	Alternative for Germany	247	1.84
Other		50	0.37
Valid votes		13,393	99.2
Invalid votes		113	0.8
Total		13,506	100.0
Electorate/voter turnout		34,785	38.83

The most recent municipal election result, of 2019, was as follows:

Party	Votes	%	Seats
Free Voters Baden-Württemberg (FW)	167,411	29.4	9
Christian Democratic Union (CDU)	125,390	22.0	7
Alliance 90/The Greens (Grüne)	125,080	22.0	7
Social Democratic Party (SPD)	84,767	14.9	5
Free Democratic Party (FDP)	45,748	8.0	3
The Left (Die Linke)	20,821	3.7	1
Valid votes	19,826	96.3	
Invalid votes	762	3.7	
Total	20,588	100.0	32
Electorate/voter turnout	34,687	59.4	

== Notable people ==
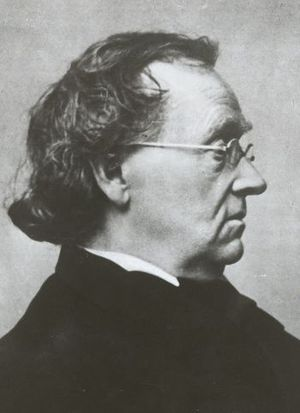
Eduard Mörike

- Eduard Mörike (1804–1875), Swabian poet, made his first sermon in Bernhäuser Jakobuskirche and lived locally in 1829 whilst a vicar
- Michael Ende (1929–1995), writer of books for children, (Die unendliche Geschichte, Momo), died locally
- Roman Herzog (1934–2017), politician (CDU), former President of Germany 1994 to 1999, lived locally
- Paul Maar (born 1937), writer and illustrator, taught locally in the 1970s for several years as an art teacher
- Johanna Zeul (born 1981), singer songwriter.
- Princess Claire of Luxembourg (born 1985), member of the Grand Ducal Family of Luxembourg.

=== Sport ===
- Laura Siegemund (born 1988), tennis player
- Helen Grobert (born 1992), cross-country cyclist
- Marvin Plattenhardt (born 1992), football player at Hertha BSC, played 326 games and 7 for Germany
- Niko Dobros (born 1993), German-Greek footballer who has played over 230 games
- Leonie Adam (born 1993), trampoline gymnast
- Precious Ugwu, football player at Fc Volendam

== Twin towns – sister cities ==
Filderstadt is twinned with:

- Dombasle-sur-Meurthe, France
- Oschatz, Germany
- Poltava, Ukraine
- Selby, England, United Kingdom
- La Souterraine, France
