= Eberhard Stroot =

German decathlete

Personal information
- Nationality: German
- Born: 20 March 1951 (age 74); Bruchhausen, West Germany

Sport
- Sport: Athletics
- Event: Decathlon

Eberhard Stroot (born 20 March 1951) is a German athlete. He competed in the men's decathlon at the 1976 Summer Olympics.
