= Valeriu Caceanov =

Soviet decathlete

Personal information
- Nationality: Soviet
- Born: 12 July 1954 (age 71) Saint Petersburg, Soviet Union

Sport
- Sport: Athletics
- Event: Decathlon
Medal record
Representing Soviet Union
Summer Universiade
Silver medal – second place	1977 Sofia	Decathlon

Valeriu Caceanov (Russian: Валерий Качанов, born 12 July 1954) is a Soviet athlete. He competed in the men's decathlon at the 1980 Summer Olympics.
