= Yuriy Kutsenko =

Soviet-born Russian decathlete (1952-2018)

Personal information
- Born: March 5, 1952
- Died: May 22, 2018 (aged 66)
Medal record
Men's Athletics
Representing the Soviet Union
Olympic Games
Silver medal – second place	1980 Moscow	Decathlon

Yuriy Mikhaylovich Kutsenko (Russian: Ю́рий Миха́йлович Куце́нко; 5 March 1952 – 22 May 2018) was a Soviet-born Russian athlete who competed mainly in the Decathlon, representing VSS Trud at the national level.

== Biography ==
Kutsenko was born and spent his childhood in Tavrovo, Belgorodsky District, Belgorod Oblast, learning at the village eight-year school and playing football, volleyball, ice hockey, and lapta in his free time. After finishing the school, he entered Shebekino chemico-mechanical technicum, where he became interested in orienteering. He then had served in the Soviet Army for two years and worked in the boiler factory Energomash in Belgorod since 1974. There was a sports club Ellada by the factory, where he was invited to train in the athletics section. After a year in the club, at age 23 Kutsenko became interested in the Decathlon. Serious trainings began, as did gradual growth in the sport. In 1976 Kutsenko was a Candidate for Master of Sports, in 1977—Master of Sports of the USSR, and in 1978—Master of Sports of the USSR, International Class.

== Career ==
His first victories were the title of the Oblast Champion in GTO, a victory in the Ministry Competition in orienteering and the title of the Oblast Champion in Long Jump. In 1978 he entered the extramural Physical Culture Department of Belgorod Pedagogical Institute.

Kutsenko competed for the USSR in the 1980 Summer Olympics held in Moscow in the decathlon where he won the silver medal. After the Olympics, Kutsenko returned to the factory Energomash, where he worked as a blacksmith for twenty years.
