= Elías Sveinsson =

Icelandic decathlete

Personal information
- Full name: Elías Rúnar Sveinsson
- Nationality: Icelandic
- Born: 10 January 1952 (age 73)

Sport
- Sport: Athletics
- Event: Decathlon

Elías Rúnar Sveinsson (born 10 January 1952) is an Icelandic athlete. He competed in the men's decathlon at the 1976 Summer Olympics.
