= Mikhail Zhelanov =

Russian footballer and functionary

Personal information
- Full name: Mikhail Vladimirovich Zhelanov
- Date of birth: 24 July 1964 (age 62)
- Place of birth: Potsdam, East Germany
- Height: 1.87 m (6 ft 1 1/2 in)
- Position: Forward

Senior career*
Years	Team	Apps	(Gls)
1981–1986	FC Torpedo Moscow	1	(0)
1986	FC Nistru Chişinău	18	(0)
1987–1988	Sport Tallinn	31	(5)
1988	PFC CSKA-2 Moscow	25	(5)
1991	FC Nyva Vinnytsia	13	(0)
1991	FC Khimik Dzerzhinsk	8	(2)
1995	FC Orekhovo Orekhovo-Zuyevo	24	(0)
1996	FC UralAZ Miass	28	(2)

Managerial career
- 2002: PFC CSKA Moscow (reserves administrator)
- 2003: FC Uralan Elista (administrator)
- 2009–2013: FC Spartak Moscow (general manager)
- * Club domestic league appearances and goals

Mikhail Vladimirovich Zhelanov (Russian: Михаил Владимирович Желанов; born 24 July 1964) is a Russian professional football functionary and a former player.
