= Colin Boreham =

British decathlete (born 1954)

Personal information
- Nationality: British
- Born: 26 March 1954 (age 72) Luton, England
- Height: 188 cm (6 ft 2 in)
- Weight: 87 kg (192 lb)

Sport
- Sport: Athletics
- Event: Decathlon / high jump
- Club: Bournemouth AC

Colin Aubrey Geddes Boreham (born 26 March 1954) is a British former athlete. He competed at the 1984 Summer Olympics.

== Biography ==
Boreham attended Bournemouth School, then studied Physical Education at the University of Birmingham in 1975. He then completed his Masters degree at University of California, Berkeley in 1976.

Boreham finished third behind Mike Colin Campbell in the high jump event at the 1971 AAA Championships and then finished second behind Milan Jamrich at the 1972 AAA Championships but by virtue of being the highest placed British athlete was considered the British high jump champion. In 1974, he broke the UK high jump record with 2.11 metres.

Boreham then concentrated on decathlon and would become the British decathlon champion after winning the event at the 1981 AAA Championships. Representing Northern Ireland, he finished eighth in the decathlon at the 1982 Commonwealth Games.

At the 1984 Olympic Games in Los Angeles, he represented Great Britain in the men's decathlon.

He also has a post graduate teaching certificate from St Luke's College Exeter, and completed his PhD at the Queen’s University of Belfast in 1986.

He taught at Queen's University Belfast, where he was director of physical education from 1977 to 1996. He was then appointed Professor of Sports Science at the University of Ulster, and in 2006 took up the post of Professor and founding director of the Institute for Sports and Health at University College Dublin. His research concentrated on the health benefits of exercise in young and elderly populations, resulting in over 200 peer-reviewed publications.
