= Sergey Zhelanov =

Soviet decathlete

Sergei Zhelanov
Personal information
- Born: 14 June 1957 (age 69) Aleksin, Tula Oblast
Medal record
Men's Athletics
Representing the Soviet Union
Olympic Games
Bronze medal – third place	1980 Moscow	Decathlon
Summer Universiade
Silver medal – second place	1981 Bucharest	Decathlon

Sergei Viktorovich Zhelanov (Russian: Серге́й Викторович Желанов) (born 14 June 1957) is a Soviet athlete who mainly competed in the Decathlon. He trained at Dynamo in Moscow.

He competed for the Soviet Union at the 1980 Summer Olympics held in Moscow, Soviet Union where he won the bronze medal in the men's decathlon event.
