= Trond Skramstad =

Norwegian decathlete

Trond Skramstad (born 6 December 1960) is a Norwegian decathlete. He represented Kongsberg IF. Skramstad became Norwegian decathlon champion in 1983, 1985 and 1986.

Representing the Mount St. Mary's Mountaineers track and field team, in 1982 Skramstad became decathlon champion at both the NCAA Division I Men's Outdoor Track and Field Championships and the NCAA Division II Men's Outdoor Track and Field Championships, achieving both feats in a ten-day span.

His personal best in decathlon is 8097 points, achieved in June 1984 in Emmitsburg at Mount St. Mary's University . This was the Norwegian record until August 1999, when Benjamin Jensen improved it to 8160 points.

== Achievements ==
Year	Competition	Venue	Position	Notes
Representing Norway
1982	European Championships	Athens, Greece	18th	Decathlon
1983	World Championships	Helsinki, Finland	11th	Decathlon
1984	Olympic Games	Los Angeles, United States	17th	Decathlon
