= Lapta (game) =

Bat-and-ball sport

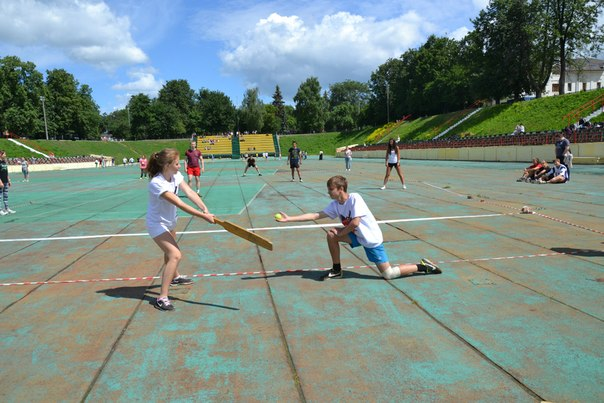
A lapta game being played in 2014

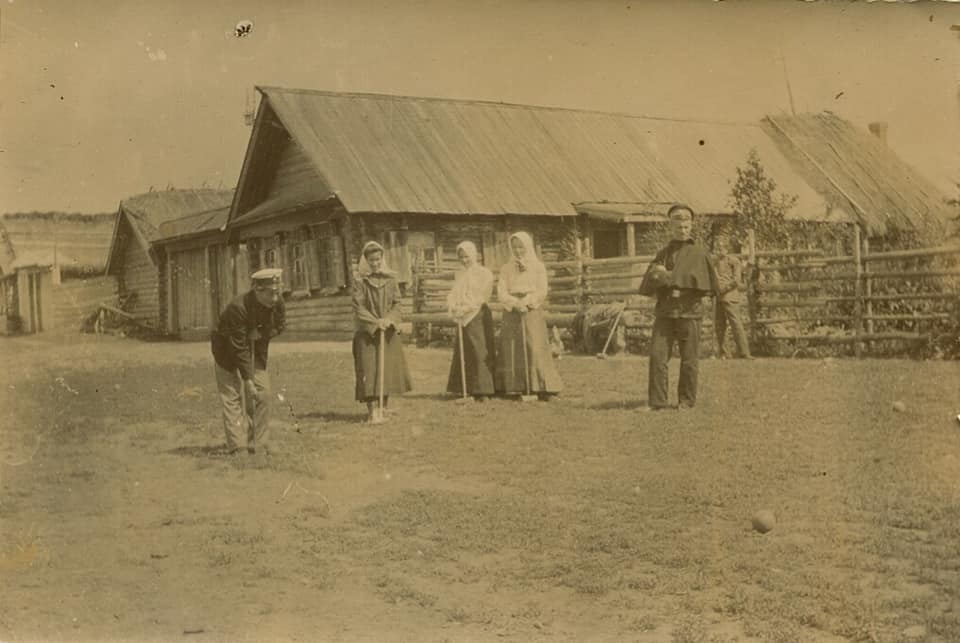
A lapta game being played in Tsivilsk, early 20th century

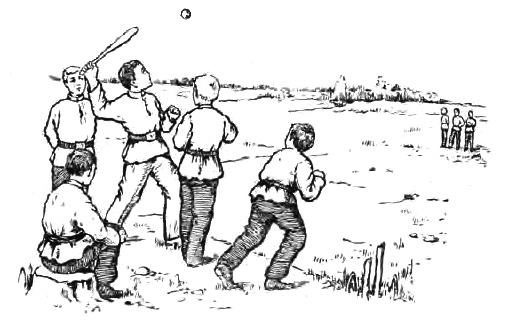
An illustration of a group of boys playing lapta (1915)

Lapta (Russian: лапта́) is a Russian folk game of the bat-and-ball type, first known to be played in the 14th century.

== History ==
Lapta is documented as early as the 14th century; mentions of lapta have been found in medieval manuscripts, and balls and bats were found in the 14th-century layers during excavations in Novgorod.

Peter the Great encouraged his elite guard to play lapta for physical training. Russian national values were ascribed to the game in modern times, with writer Aleksandr I. Kuprin having praised the game for qualities such as loyalty, accuracy, speed and strength skills, as well as resourcefulness.

During the Soviet period, the sport, along with other traditional sports such as gorodki, was promoted and attempts were made to develop them into modern sports of a Soviet type. The game's development reached its peak in the 1950s, with thousands of lapta teams registered. Russian championships of lapta were held from 1958, and lapta was entered in the program of the Russian Spartakiads in the following year; however, these attempts at promoting the sport later lost priority. Since 1990, annual championships in Russia have been held and the sport has seen a revival.

== Rules ==
Field for lapta

The game is played outside on a field the size of half a football pitch 20 × 25 sazhens (140 ft × 175 ft, 42.7 m × 53.3 m). There are five people on the field from the defending team, as well as pitcher/server. This pitcher server stands near the batter of the opposing team and hits a ball in the direction of the batter. The team that bats contains six people. Each hitter gets two chances to hit the ball over a 10m line. If they succeed at that, the runners can go to an endline at the other end of the pitch. If a player manages to run between the two endpoints, they get 2 points. A game lasts an hour, split into two equal halves.

The edges of the field are marked with parallel lines, called salo (сало).

The goal of the game is to hit the ball, served by a player of the opposite team, with the bat and send the ball as far as possible, then run across the field to the kon (кон) line, and if possible to run back to the gorod (город) line.

The running player tries to avoid being hit with the ball, which is thrown by the opposing team members. For successful runs, the team earns points. A team wins by either getting more points during the scheduled time or by having all its players complete runs.

A description of lapta is given by Aleksandr I. Kuprin:

This folk game is one of the most interesting and useful games. Lapta requires resourcefulness, deep breathing, faithfulness to your group, attention, dexterity, fast running, good aiming and marksmanship, strong striking hands, and firm eternal confidence that you cannot be defeated. The lazy and cowardly have no place in this game.
