= Bernhausen =

Coordinates: 48.679333°N 9.218°E

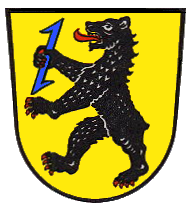
Coat of arms of the former municipality.

Bernhausen is a former municipality in the Esslingen district, in Baden-Württemberg, Germany.

It was first recorded in year 1089 as Berinhusen.

In 1975 it was merged with the municipalities Bonlanden, Plattenhardt, Sielmingen and Harthausen to form the new town Filderstadt. Bernhausen is today a quartier of that town, formally named Filderstadt-Bernhausen. It has 13,216 inhabitants. Line S2 of the Stuttgart S-Bahn terminates at Filderstadt station in Bernhausen.
