= Georg Werthner =

Austrian decathlete (born 1956)

Personal information
- Born: 7 April 1956 (age 70) Linz, Austria

Sport
- Sport: Decathlon
Medal record
Representing Austria
Summer Universiade
Bronze medal – third place	1981 Bucharest	Decathlon
Bronze medal – third place	1983 Edmonton	Decathlon

Dr. Georg Werthner (born 7 April 1956) is an Austrian decathlete. He is notable for being the first athlete to finish four Olympic decathlons. In the 1988 Summer Olympics, Daley Thompson crossed the finish-line a little more than 18 seconds after him to become the second athlete to do this.

Born in Linz, Werthner was the Austrian national champion in the decathlon 8 times (1975, 1977, 1979, 1980, 1982, 1984, 1986, and 1988), along with being individual event champion in long jump (1977), triple jump (1977, 1979, 1980, and 1982), javelin throw (1979-1981, 1983, 1984, and 1988). Running with his ULC Linz club, he was a member of their 1980 and 1981 winning 4 × 100 metres relay team, and their 1980 4 × 400 metres relay team. He is now part of their hall of fame, still holding club records for high jump, pole vault, javelin throw, pentathlon and decathlon. He switched to the Zehnkampf-Union decathlon club in 1984.

Werthner is still active in Masters athletics and has won numerous World Masters Athletics Championships.

== Achievements ==
Year	Tournament	Venue	Result	Distance
1975	Universiade	Rome, Italy	5th	Decathlon
1976	Olympic Games	Montreal, Canada	16th	Decathlon
1979	Universiade	Mexico City, Mexico	6th	Decathlon
1980	Olympic Games	Moscow, Soviet Union	4th	Decathlon
1981	Universiade	Bucharest, Romania	3rd	Decathlon
1982	European Championships	Athens, Greece	5th	Decathlon
1983	Universiade	Edmonton, Canada	3rd	Decathlon
1984	Olympic Games	Los Angeles, United States	9th	Decathlon
1988	Olympic Games	Seoul, South Korea	21st	Decathlon
