= Decathlon scoring tables =

Rules for decathlon scoring

The scoring tables for the decathlon have undergone continual evolution since their inception about a century ago, with several changes to both the character of the equations and the indices on which the equations are based.

== Early decathlon tables ==
All of the earliest attempts at formalizing decathlon scoring, from the first formal submission (prepared by the U.S. in 1884) until 1915, involved linear scoring equations. The American model was based on world records, but models concurrently used by several Nordic countries were based on their respective national records.

The decathlon was first included in the Olympic Games in 1912, requiring a uniform standard. The first Olympic tables adopted were also linear functions; they were based not on world or national records, but, rather, on the 1908 Olympic records for each of the individual events.

The tables were soon updated with the 1912 Olympic records, while the complicated and universally unpopular extension of event scores to three decimal places was discarded in favor of integer scores; thus, these tables were used for the next four Olympiads.

The rapid evolution of the scoring tables caused results to vary widely: for instance, Akilles Järvinen, the silver medalist in the decathlon in both the 1928 and 1932 Olympics, would have won gold medals in both years rather handily under most later scoring tables.

== Tests for legitimacy ==
Beginning in 1920, the IAAF considered, at least, the following criteria for a legitimate decathlon scoring table: (1) The table should reflect the fact that, at higher levels of performance, a unit gain (such as a decrement of 0.01 second in sprint times) is more significant than at lower levels of performance, because of the physiological limitations of the human body. (2) The scores for different events should be comparable, in a manner such that equal skill levels in different events (however difficult it is to define such a concept) are rewarded with equal point levels.

== 1934 scoring tables ==
In 1934, the IAAF adopted a new set of scoring tables, proposed by Suomen Urheiluliitto (the Finnish athletics federation), that had already been used for a few years in national competitions in Finland.

This scoring system implemented vast changes, with the following features:

(1) All of the individual events were scored with exponential functions, rather than the linear functions that had characterized all decathlon scoring tables to date. For field events, this was a straightforward statistical procedure; for track events, the reciprocal of the athlete's time, representing speed, was used as the independent variable.

(2) The tables ranged from 0 to 1150 points per event. Zero points corresponded to the performances of untrained schoolchildren, while 1000 point performances corresponded closely to world records.

== 1950 scoring tables ==
After World War II, the Finnish and Swedish athletics federations joined forces to draft scoring tables appropriate for Olympic athletes' improved postwar performances. All of the tables remained progressive in nature; in fact, the progressive character of every one of the ten tables increased.

== 1962 scoring tables ==
In the years following the implementation of the 1950 tables, controversy arose in regard to the highly progressive character of the tables.

Specifically, the tables conferred a distinct advantage on decathletes who were specialists in individual events, with passing, but not stellar, performances in the other events, while putting well-rounded athletes at a relative disadvantage.

To remedy this problem, Axel Jörbeck, of the Swedish athletic federation, devised new tables that were actually regressive in throwing events, while retaining their progressive character in track events. The rationale behind the changes was the proportion between kinetic energy imparted to a throwing implement and the square of its initial velocity – and therefore distance travelled – so that a progressive or even linear table caused unfairly large increments in the score for throwing events.

== 1984 scoring tables ==
By the early 1980s, more problems had been pointed out with the then-current scoring tables. Specifically, the regressive nature of Jörbeck's tables for the field events seemed to obviate the importance of elite performances in those events; decathletes' field-event performances had improved to the point where further score increments were practically negligible.

Moreover, besides sapping decathletes' motivation to improve in field events, the tables also gave an unfair advantage to competitors in the track events – both because those tables were still progressive, and because decathletes' performances in those events were much closer to the world records.

The IAAF working committee therefore met in 1983 in Prague to develop improved tables, putting forth the following nine principles, which still stand today:

1. The decathlon scoring tables should differ from those used for individual event scoring.
2. The scores for different events should be comparable, in a manner such that equal skill levels in different events (however difficult it is to define such a concept) are rewarded with equal point levels.
3. The new tables should be one of the following:
  1. modified versions of the existing ones,
  2. linear in all events, or
  3. slightly progressive in all events.
4. The tables should be applicable to all levels of performance, from youth to elite.
5. Men and women should have different tables.
6. Specialists' performances should be the basis for the scores in the tables.
7. The new tables should be applicable now and in the future.
8. The total scores using the new tables for the top world-class athletes should remain approximately the same (about 8500 points).
9. As much as possible, the new tables should ensure that a specialist in one event cannot overcome top performances in the other events.

The 1984 tables are still in use today, with a slight update in 1998 to add entries for the long throws for odd numbers of centimeters (these were rounded to the next-lower multiples of 2 cm until 1997).

== See also ==
- Timeline of changes in the sport of athletics
