= Jürgen Hingsen =

German decathlete

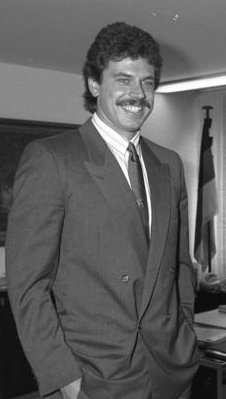
- Jürgen Hingsen in 1987

Personal information
- Nationality: German
- Born: 25 January 1958 (age 68) Duisburg, West Germany
- Height: 2.00 m (6 ft 7 in)
- Weight: 102 kg (225 lb)

Sport
- Sport: Decathlon
- Club: Bayer Leverkusen; LAV Bayer Uerdingen; Dormagen, Krefeld

Achievements and titles
- Personal best: Decathlon 8,730 points
Medal record
Men's athletics
Representing West Germany
Olympic Games
| Silver medal – second place | 1984 Los Angeles | Decathlon |
World Championships
| Silver medal – second place | 1983 Helsinki | Decathlon |
European Championships
| Silver medal – second place | 1982 Athens | Decathlon |
| Silver medal – second place | 1986 Stuttgart | Decathlon |
Summer Universiade
| Silver medal – second place | 1979 Mexico City | Decathlon |

Jürgen Hingsen (German pronunciation: [ˈjʏʁɡn̩ ˈhɪŋsn̩]; born 25 January 1958) is German retired decathlete. He represented West Germany, winning several medals at international championships and Olympic Games in the 1980s, and held the decathlon world record in 1982 and again from 1983 to 1984. His rivalry with British decathlete Daley Thompson proved one of the most exciting in athletics during the 1980s.

== Biography ==
The 2 metres (6 ft 7 in) tall athlete came second in the Olympic decathlon at the 1984 Summer Olympics in Los Angeles just behind Daley Thompson. Also in 1984, Hingsen set his personal best in the decathlon at 8832 points – then a world record, and the German record until 2023.

During the 1988 Summer Olympics in Seoul, South Korea, Hingsen made three false starts in the 100 metre sprint, and he was disqualified from that event – and effectively eliminated from that decathlon competition.

=== Personal bests ===
| Event | Performance | Location | Date | Points |
|---|---|---|---|---|
| Decathlon | 8,730 points | Stuttgart | August 28, 1986 | 8,730 points |
| 100 metres | 10.91 | Los Angeles | August 8, 1984 | 919 points |
| Long jump | 8.04 m (26 ft 4 1/2 in) | Munich | July 25, 1982 | 1,146 points |
| Shot put | 16.57 m (54 ft 4 1/4 in) | Filderstadt | June 14, 1986 | 917 points |
| High jump | 2.15 m (7 ft 1/2 in) | Ulm | August 14, 1982 | 1,046 points |
| 400 metres | 47.65 | Ulm | August 14, 1982 | 1,003 points |
| 110 metres hurdles | 14.07 | Mannheim | June 9, 1984 | 1,053 points |
| Discus throw | 50.82 m (166 ft 8 3/4 in) | Los Angeles | August 9, 1984 | 892 points |
| Pole vault | 4.90 m (16 ft 3/4 in) | Helsinki | August 13, 1983 | 967 points |
| Javelin throw | 64.38 m (211 ft 2 1/2 in) | Stuttgart | August 28, 1986 | 880 points |
| 1500 metres | 4:15.13 | Ulm | August 15, 1982 | 685 points |
| Virtual Best Performance | | | | 9,508 points |

Records
| Preceded by (United Kingdom) Daley Thompson | Men's decathlon world record holder 15 August 1982 – 8 September 1982 | Succeeded by (United Kingdom) Daley Thompson |
| Preceded by (United Kingdom) Daley Thompson | Men's decathlon world record holder 6 June 1983 – 9 August 1984 | Succeeded by (United Kingdom) Daley Thompson |
