= Guido Kratschmer =

German decathlete

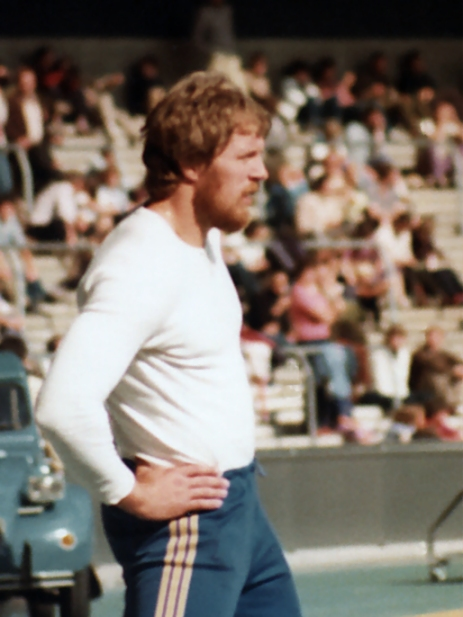
- Kratschmer in Cologne, 1981

Personal information
- Born: 10 January 1953 (age 73) Klotzenhof, West Germany

Sport
- Sport: Athletics
Medal record
Men's athletics
Representing West Germany
Olympic Games
Silver medal – second place	1976 Montreal	Decathlon
European Championships
Bronze medal – third place	1974 Rome	Decathlon

Guido Kratschmer (German pronunciation: [ˈɡiːdo ˈkʁatʃmɐ]; born 10 January 1953) is a retired West German decathlete. His sports club was the USC Mainz.

Kratschmer competed at the 1976 Summer Olympics in Montreal, where he won the silver medal in the men's decathlon event. He could not participate at the 1980 Summer Olympics because of the boycott.

In 1980, Kratschmer broke the world record held by Daley Thompson, but in 1982, Kratschmer's mark was in turn topped by Thompson.

Kratschmer's personal best total in the decathlon was 8667 points, achieved in June 1980 in Bernhausen, West Germany. This total ranks him seventh all-time among German decathletes, behind Leo Neugebauer, Jürgen Hingsen, Uwe Freimuth, Siegfried Wentz, Frank Busemann and Torsten Voss.

== International competitions ==
Year	Competition	Venue	Position	Event	Notes
1974	European Championships	Rome, Italy	3rd	Decathlon	
1976	Olympic Games	Montreal, Canada	2nd	Decathlon	
1982	European Championships	Athens, Greece	9th	Decathlon	
1983	World Championships	Helsinki, Finland	9th	Decathlon	
1984	Olympic Games	Los Angeles, United States	4th	Decathlon	

Records
Preceded by Daley Thompson	Men's decathlon world record holder 14 June 1980 – 23 May 1982	Succeeded by Daley Thompson
Awards
Preceded by Harald Schmid	German Sportsman of the Year; 1980	Succeeded by Toni Mang
