= Daley Thompson =

English decathlete (born 1958)

Daley Thompson CBE
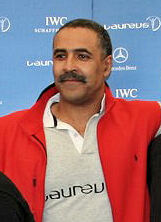
- Thompson at the Laureus Day in June 2007

Personal information
- Full name: Francis Morgan Ayodélé Thompson
- Born: 30 July 1958 (age 68) Notting Hill, London, England
- Height: 6 ft 0 in (184 cm)
- Weight: 14 st 7 lb (203 lb; 92 kg)

Sport
- Sport: Decathlon
- Club: Essex Beagles

Achievements and titles
- Personal best: Decathlon 8,847 points
Medal record
International athletics competitions
Event	1st	2nd	3rd
Olympic Games	2	0	0
World Championships	1	0	0
European Championships	2	1	1
Commonwealth Games	3	1	0
Total	8	2	1
Men's athletics
Representing Great Britain
Olympic Games
Gold medal – first place	1980 Moscow	Decathlon
Gold medal – first place	1984 Los Angeles	Decathlon
World Championships
Gold medal – first place	1983 Helsinki	Decathlon
European Championships
Gold medal – first place	1982 Athens	Decathlon
Gold medal – first place	1986 Stuttgart	Decathlon
Silver medal – second place	1978 Prague	Decathlon
Bronze medal – third place	1986 Stuttgart	4 × 100 m
Representing England
Commonwealth Games
Gold medal – first place	1978 Edmonton	Decathlon
Gold medal – first place	1982 Brisbane	Decathlon
Gold medal – first place	1986 Edinburgh	Decathlon
Silver medal – second place	1986 Edinburgh	4 × 100 m

CBE ribbon

Francis Morgan Ayodélé Thompson, CBE (born 30 July 1958) is an English former decathlete. He won the decathlon gold medal at the Olympic Games in 1980 and 1984, and broke the world record for the event four times. He was unbeaten in competition for nine years.

With four world records, two Olympic gold medals, three Commonwealth titles and wins in the World and European Championships, Thompson is considered by many to be the greatest athlete of all time, and was described in The Independent as "the world's greatest all-round athlete." His autobiography, Daley: Olympic Superstar, was published in 2024.

== Early life and education ==
Thompson was born in Notting Hill, London, the second son of a British Nigerian father, Frank Thompson, who ran a minicab firm, and Scottish mother, Lydia, from Dundee. When Thompson was six his father left home. When he was seven Lydia sent him to Farney Close Boarding School, Bolney, Sussex, which he described as "a place for troubled children". When Thompson was eleven or twelve his father was shot dead in Streatham by the husband of a woman whom he and a friend had dropped off. Thompson's forename is a contraction of Ayodelé, a Yoruba word meaning "joy comes home". Thompson's first ambition was to become a professional footballer but he later switched his interests to athletics.

== Athletics ==
=== Early career ===
Initially, he was a member of Haywards Heath Harriers, but when he returned to London in 1975 he joined the Newham and Essex Beagles Athletics club, training as a sprinter. He began to be coached by Bob Mortimer, who suggested he try out for the decathlon because one of his decathletes had chickenpox. He competed in his first decathlon later that year in Cwmbran, Wales, which he won along with his next competition. In 1976, he won the AAA title and was 18 at the Montréal Olympic Games. The following year, he won the European Junior title and in 1978 came the first of his three Commonwealth titles. In 1979, he failed to finish in his only decathlon of that year, but won the long jump at the UK Championships.

=== 1980–1986: Breaking records ===
Thompson opened the 1980 Olympic season with a world decathlon record of 8,648 points at Götzis, Austria, in May, and followed this by winning gold at the Moscow Olympics. After a quiet 1981 season, he was in top form in 1982; back at Götzis in May, he raised the world record to 8,730 points and then in September, at the European Championships in Athens, he took the record up to 8,774 points. The following month in Brisbane, Thompson took his second Commonwealth title.

In 1983, Thompson won the inaugural World Championships and became the first decathlete to hold a continental title, in his case the European title and the World and Olympic titles simultaneously. He also became by virtue of his World title, the first athlete in any athletics event to hold Olympic, World, continental and Commonwealth Games titles in a single event simultaneously.

Thompson spent much of the summer of 1984 in California preparing for the defence of his Olympic title, with Jürgen Hingsen, the West German who had succeeded Thompson as the world record holder, expected to be a major threat. Thompson took the lead in the first event, a lead he never relinquished throughout the competition. It seemed that, by easing off in the 1,500 metres, he had missed tying the world record by just one point. When the photo-finish pictures were examined, however, it was found that Thompson should have been credited with one more point in the 110 metres hurdles so he had in fact, equalled Hingsen's record.

When the new scoring tables were introduced, Thompson became the sole record holder once more with a recalculated score of 8,847 points – a world record that stood until 1992, when it was surpassed by the American athlete Dan O'Brien with a score of 8,891. Thompson's two victories in the Olympic decathlon are a feat shared only with the Americans Bob Mathias and Ashton Eaton. Thompson's 1984 performance is still the UK record. In 2002, Thompson's successful defence of his Olympic title was ranked number 34 on Channel 4's poll of the 100 Greatest Sporting Moments.

=== 1987–1990: Defeat and injury ===
Thompson won his third Commonwealth title in 1986 and also won another European Championship but after that he never quite recaptured the excellent form of earlier years. In 1987, he suffered his first decathlon defeat for nine years when he finished ninth in the World Championships, and at his fourth Olympics in Seoul in 1988 he finished fourth. He made the Commonwealth Games team for the fourth time in 1990 but was forced to withdraw because of injury.

=== Rivalry with Jürgen Hingsen ===
Thompson's rivalry with West German athlete Jürgen Hingsen attracted considerable public interest throughout the 1980s. The pair constantly traded world records, but Thompson always had the upper hand in the major events, remaining undefeated in all competitions for nine years between 1978 and 1987.

=== Promotional activities ===
Thompson was also well known for his appearances in commercials for the sports drink Lucozade in the 1980s, which first appeared in the UK in 1983. Thompson's name was used for three officially licensed home computer games by Ocean Software in the 1980s: Daley Thompson's Decathlon, Daley Thompson's Supertest and Daley Thompson's Olympic Challenge. He is also a brand ambassador for a travel agency network "Not Just Travel".

=== Personal bests ===
Information from World Athletics profile unless otherwise noted.

Event	Performance	Location	Date	Points
Decathlon	8,798 points	Los Angeles	9 August 1984	8,798 points
100 metres	10.26 (+2.0 m/s)	Stuttgart	27 August 1986	1,032 points
Long jump	8.01 m (26 ft 3 1/4 in) (+0.4 m/s)	Los Angeles	8 August 1984	1,063 points
Shot put	15.73 m (51 ft 7 1/4 in)	Stuttgart	27 August 1986	835 points
High jump	2.11 m (6 ft 11 in)	Götzis	17 May 1980	906 points
400 metres	46.86	Götzis	22 May 1982	965 points
110 metres hurdles	14.04	Stuttgart	28 August 1986	969 points
Discus throw	47.62 m (156 ft 2 3/4 in)	Arles	18 May 1986	821 points
Pole vault	5.10 m (16 ft 8 3/4 in)	Toronto	8 June 1983	941 points
Javelin throw	64.04 m (210 ft 1 1/4 in)	Seoul	29 September 1988	799 points
1500 metres	4:20.3	Cwmbran	23 May 1976	810 points
Virtual Best Performance				9,141 points

== After athletics ==
=== Football ===
Thompson was forced to retire from athletics in 1992, due to a persistent hamstring injury. In the 1990s, he briefly played reserve team football for Mansfield Town and played for non-league teams Stevenage Borough and Ilkeston.

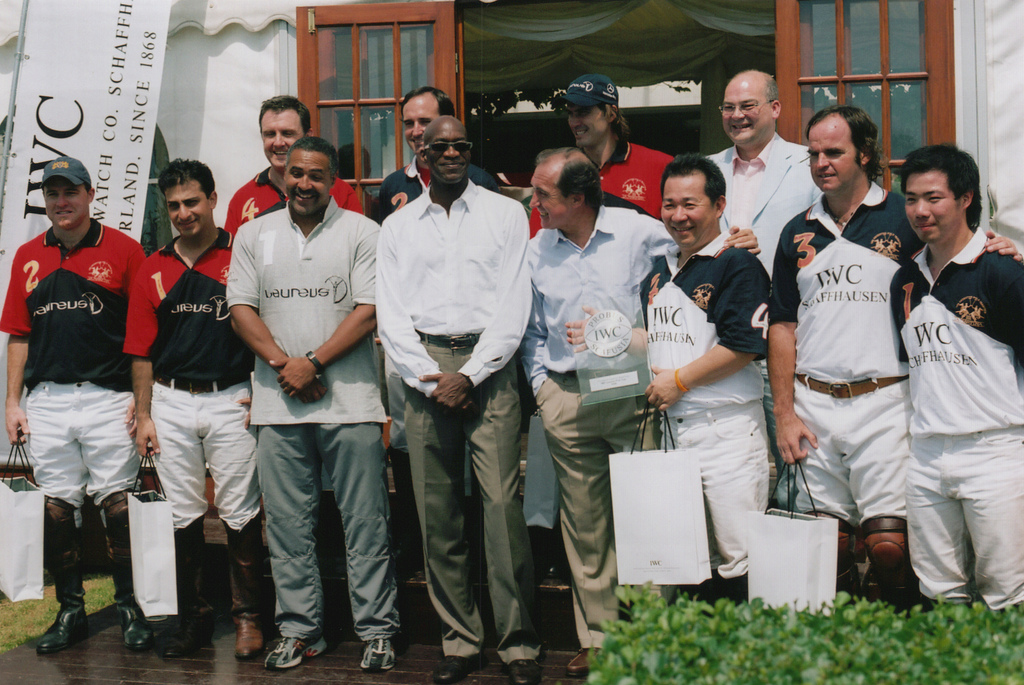
Thompson (third from left, front row) standing next to Ed Moses at the 2006 Laureus Day held at the Ham Polo Club, London

He also worked as fitness coach for Wimbledon and Luton Town.

=== Motor Racing ===
Daley Thompson took up Motor Racing full-time in the 1993 National Saloon Car Cup, driving a Peugeot 106. He competed in the lowest class (Class E) for up-to-1400cc cars and won his class at Thruxton. He also entered his Peugeot in the 1993 Willhire 24 Hour race at Snetterton, sharing with Joel Wykeham and then-Peugeot BTCC works driver Eugene O'Brien.

Thompson also took part in the 1994 Ford Credit Fiesta Challenge Championship.

=== Other ===
Thompson worked as a fitness trainer and motivational speaker, as well as appearing at corporate events. In 1994 Thompson trained with Reading Football Club and scored in a friendly against Leatherhead.

Thompson was an ambassador for the London 2012 Summer Olympics, focusing during the bid stage on highlighting the benefits that hosting the Olympics would bring to education and sport in schools. He also took part in the 2011 TV series Jamie's Dream School.

In 2015, Thompson opened his own gym, Daley Fitness, located on Upper Richmond Road in London. In 2018, he joined chef Gary Barnshaw and co-founded DT10 Sports, creating and selling a range of low-sugar protein shakes and sports bars.

In April 2025, Thompson entered the Celebrity Big Brother house to appear as a housemate on the twenty-fourth series.

== Public image ==
Thompson was a natural showman who endeared himself to the British public with his irreverent personality and anti-establishment attitude. He won the BBC Sports Personality of the Year award in 1982, was appointed an MBE in the 1983 New Year Honours and promoted to the CBE in the 2000 New Year Honours.

At the 1984 Los Angeles Olympics, Thompson, who had just won his second Olympic decathlon gold medal, wore a T-shirt that read "IS THE WORLD'S 2ND GREATEST ATHLETE GAY?". United States sprinter Carl Lewis had been dealing with rumours of homosexuality and the shirt was regarded by some people as being cruelly directed at Lewis. "The second athlete could be anybody, Carl Lewis, anybody," Thompson stated.

In 2012, Thompson was accused of anti-Irish sentiment after commenting on live BBC TV that the creator of a misspelled tattoo "must have been Irish". The tattoo artist was actually American.

In August 2014, Thompson was one of 200 public figures who were signatories to a letter to The Guardian expressing their hope that Scotland would vote to remain part of the United Kingdom in September's referendum on that issue.

In 2015, Thompson co-presented the mid morning show on Talksport once a week alongside Colin Murray until Murray quit the station the following year.

Thompson features in the 2024 documentary Colin Jackson: Resilience, discussing the challenges faced by elite athletes and in particular Jackson's performance in the 1992 Olympic 110m hurdles event.

== Personal life ==
Thompson has two children with his girlfriend Lisa and three with ex-wife Tish. Thompson has sporting sons Elliot and Alex. Elliot Thompson became the national decathlon champion at the 2022 British Athletics Championships. The title was won 46 years after Daley claimed his first national title. Alex plays rugby for the University of Bath and England Sevens.

His autobiography, Daley: Olympic Superstar, was published by Chiselbury in 2024. A documentary film about his life, also titled Daley: Olympic Superstar, became available on the BBC in July 2024.

Records
Preceded by Bruce Jenner	Men's decathlon world record holder 15 May 1980 – 14 June 1980	Succeeded by Guido Kratschmer
Preceded by Guido Kratschmer	Men's decathlon world record holder 23 May 1982 – 15 August 1982	Succeeded by Jürgen Hingsen
Preceded by Jürgen Hingsen	Men's decathlon world record holder 8 September 1982 – 6 June 1983	Succeeded by Jürgen Hingsen
Preceded by Jürgen Hingsen	Men's decathlon world record holder 9 August 1984 – 5 September 1992	Succeeded by Dan O'Brien
Awards and achievements
Preceded by Ian Botham	BBC Sports Personality of the Year; 1982	Succeeded by Steve Cram
Preceded by Sebastian Coe	United Press International; Athlete of the Year; 1982	Succeeded by Carl Lewis
