= Rozendaal (surname) =

Rozendaal (pronounced [ˈroːzə(n)daːl] or, for spellings with S, [ˈroːsə(n)daːl]) is a Dutch toponymic surname. Literally meaning "rose valley", the name may indicate an origin in the city of Roosendaal, North Brabant or the towns Rozendaal (Gelderland), Rozendaal (South Holland), or Rozendaal (French Flanders). Both the surname and these town names may also have evolved from Roesendael, meaning "reed valley". Among variant spellings are Roosendaal, Roosendael, Roozendaal, and Rosendaal, all pronounced the same in Dutch. People with these surnames include:

- Eric Roozendaal (born 1962), Australian (New South Wales) politician
- Frank Rozendaal (1957–2013), Dutch ornithologist and zoologist
- Frits Rosendaal (born 1959), Dutch physician and thrombosis researcher
- Jack Rosendaal (born 1973), Dutch decathlete
- Maarten van Roozendaal (1962–2013), Dutch singer, comedian and songwriter
- Nicolaas Roosendael (1634–1686), Dutch painter
- Peter Roozendaal (born 1962), Australian rules footballer
- Rafaël Rozendaal (born 1980), Dutch-Brazilian visual artist active in New York City
- Richard Rozendaal (born 1972), Dutch track cyclist
- Ruben Rozendaal (1956–2017), Surinamese soldier involved in the 1980 military coup d'état
- Ton Roosendaal (born 1960), Dutch software developer and film producer
- Trijnie Roozendaal-Rep (born 1950), Dutch speed skater

== See also ==
- Roosendael Abbey in the province of Antwerp, Belgium
- Rosendahl (disambiguation)
- Rosendale (disambiguation)
- Rosendal (disambiguation)
- Rosenthal
- Rozendal, suburb of Stellenbosch, South Africa
