= Rozendaal (disambiguation) =

Rozendaal is a town in Gelderland, Netherlands.

Rozendaal may also refer to:

- Rozendaal, South Holland, a town South Holland, the Netherlands
- Rosendaël or Rozendaal, a former town in French Flanders, now a suburb of Dunkirk
- Rozendaal (surname), a Dutch surname

== See also ==
- Rosendaal
- Rosendahl (disambiguation)
- Rosendale (disambiguation)
- Rosendal (disambiguation)
- Roosendaal (disambiguation)
- Roosendael
- Rozendal, suburb of Stellenbosch, South Africa
