= Roosendael =

Roosendael may refer to:

- Nicolaas Roosendael (1634–1686), Dutch painter
- Roosendael Abbey, a former monastery

== See also ==
- Roosendaal (disambiguation)
- Rosendaal
- Rozendaal (disambiguation)
- Rosenthal (disambiguation)
- Rosendahl (disambiguation)
