= Roosendaal (disambiguation) =

Roosendaal is a municipality in North Brabant, Netherlands.

Roosendaal may also refer to:

- Ton Roosendaal (born 1960), Dutch software developer
- RBC Roosendaal, a football club based in Roosendaal, Netherlands
- Roosendaal railway station, a railway station in Roosendaal, Netherlands
- Roosendaal en Nispen, a former municipality in the Netherlands
- Roosendaal–Vlissingen railway, a railway line in the Netherlands
- Kruisstraat, Roosendaal, a hamlet in Roosendaal, Netherlands
- RKVV Roosendaal, a Dutch football club

== See also ==
- Rosendaal
- Rozendaal (disambiguation)
- Rosenthal (disambiguation)
- Rosendahl (disambiguation)
- Roosendael
