= Gillis Berthout =

12 century nobleman

- Chamberlain of Flanders; Lord of Leffinge, Lichtervelde, and Oudenburg (by marriage)
- Coat of arms: Or, three pales gules
- Born: 1175/80
- Died: 1241
- Noble family: Berthout
- Married: Catherina of Bailleul
- Issue: Gillis, Louis, Elizabeth, Oda
- Father: Walter II Berthout
- Mother: Goda of Loon, daughter of Louis I, Count of Loon
- Military career
- Allegiance: Crusader
- Service years: 1218–19
- Conflicts: Fifth Crusade: Siege of Damietta (1218–19)

Gillis Berthout (1175/80–1241), was a nobleman who fought on the Fifth Crusade, a hereditary chamberlain of the County of Flanders, and a Teutonic Knight. He was the founder of Rozendaal Abbey.

== Life ==
Gillis was the son of Walter II Berthout and Goda of Loon, daughter of Louis I, Count of Loon. The Berthout family held lands in Mechelen, and in the margraviate of Antwerp. Around 1205 he married the Flemish noble widow Catherina of Bailleul, daughter of Gerard, viscount of Oudenburg. They had two sons, Gillis II and Louis, and at least two daughters, Elizabeth and Oda. In 1227 he founded Rozendaal Abbey for his daughters. On behalf of his wife and step-children, Gillis from 1206 held the hereditary chamberlaincy of Flanders and lordships of Leffinge, Lichtervelde, and Oudenburg.

From 1207 he served the interests of John, King of England, receiving regular payments from him and attending upon his court. He may have fought in the battle of Bouvines. In 1219 he joined the Fifth Crusade and took part in the Siege of Damietta. He was back in Flanders in 1221, and in 1229 joined the Teutonic Order and turned over his step-children's patrimony to the Teutonic Knights.
