= Battle of the Dunes =

Battle of the Dunes may refer to:

- Battle of the Dunes (1600), a battle of the Eighty Years' War fought near Nieuwpoort in the Spanish Netherlands
- Battle of the Dunes (1658), a battle of the Franco-Spanish War and Anglo-Spanish War fought near Dunkirk in the Spanish Netherlands
