= Ludwik Peretz =

French architect (1923–2022)

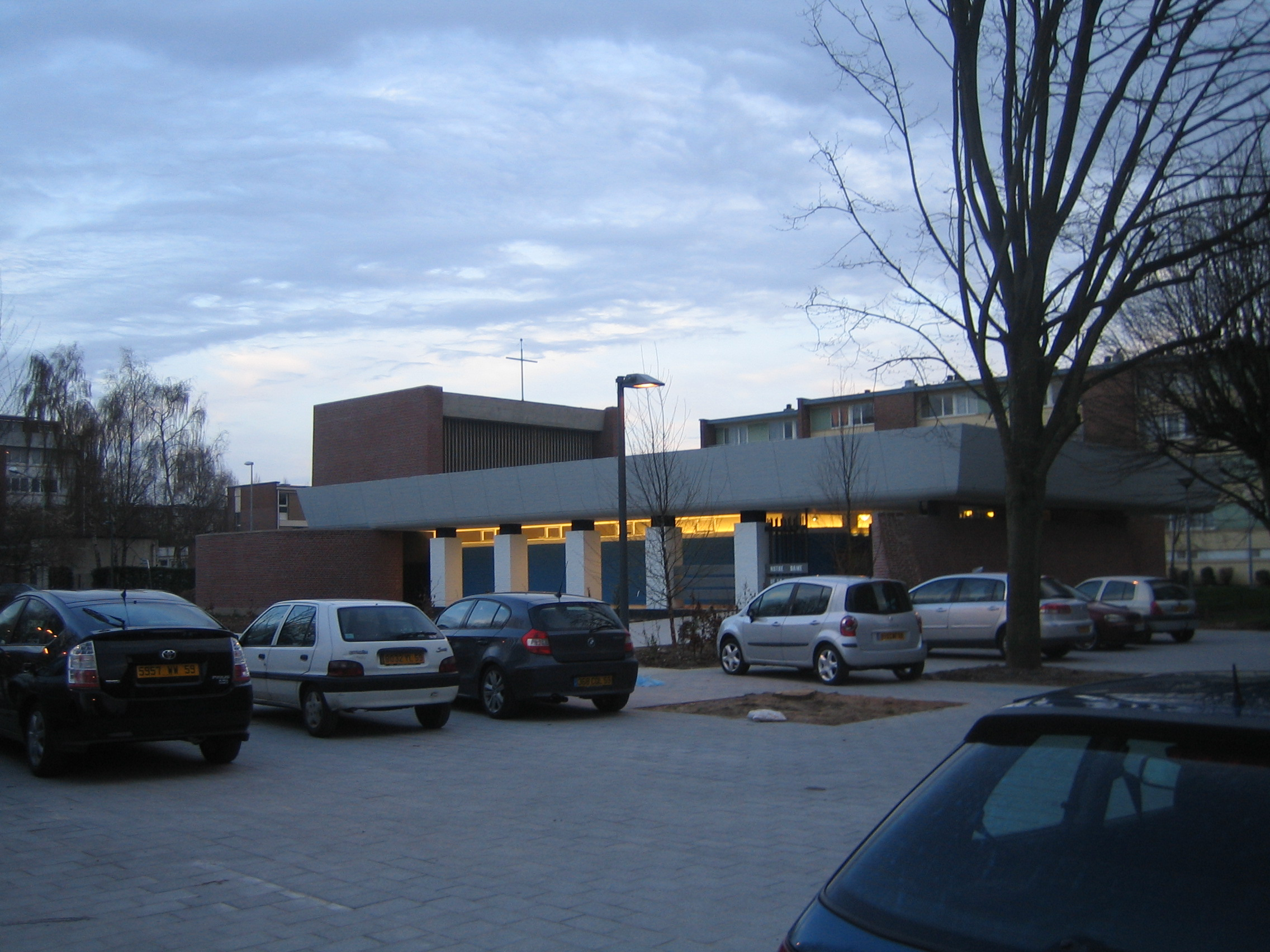
- Église de la Nativité in Villeneuve-d'Ascq
- Born: Ludwik Janusz Peretz; 9 January 1923; Warsaw, Poland
- Died: 1 December 2022 (aged 99); Villeneuve-d'Ascq, France
- Education: Warsaw University of Technology; École des beaux-arts de Lille
- Occupation: Architect

Ludwik Janusz Peretz (9 January 1923 – 1 December 2022) was a Polish-born French architect.

== Biography ==
Peretz began his university studies at the Warsaw University of Technology and served in the Home Army. He was a prisoner of war from 1944 to 1945. After World War II, he emigrated to France and became a student of Marcel Favier, Robert Clément, and André Lys at the École des beaux-arts de Lille, from where he graduated in 1955. In 1966, he became a naturalized French citizen. He worked as an architect in Roubaix and Lille, primarily working on construction of churches.

Peretz died in Villeneuve-d'Ascq on 1 December 2022, at the age of 99.

== Main constructions ==
- École des beaux-arts (Lille, 1959–1964)
- Église du Saint-Curé-d'Ars (Lille, 1960)
- Église Notre-Dame-de-la-Nativité (Villeneuve-d'Ascq, 1963)
- Chapelle Notre-Dame-de-la-Nativité (Armentières, 1964)
- Chapelle Saint-Pierre (Lomme, 1964)
- Église Saint-Joseph (Grande-Synthe, 1965)
- Chapelle Saint-Paul (Saint-André-lez-Lille, 1965)
- Église Sainte-Bernadette (Rosendaël, 1966)
- Maison Monniez (Villeneuve-d'Ascq, 1972)
- Maison Derville (Villeneuve-d'Ascq, 1973)
- Immeuble (Lille, 1975)
- Maison Camus (Villeneuve-d'Ascq, 1976)
- Maison Wallez (Mouvaux, 1979)
- Chapelle dite Centre Romero (Villeneuve-d'Ascq, 1980)
