= Agnes Haegens =

Belgian Cistercian Abbess

- Title: Abbess of Rozendaal

Personal life
- Born: 1703
- Died: 21 May 1788 (aged 84–85)
- Occupation: Cistercian Nun, Abbess

Religious life
- Religion: Roman Catholic
- Order: Cistercian Order

Agnes Haegens (1703 – 21 May 1788), also written as Agnes Haeghens, was a Cistercian nun who served as the 40th Abbess of Roosendael Abbey from 1754 to 1788. In total she spent around 66 years of her life in religious life and 34 years in prelacy.

== Biography ==
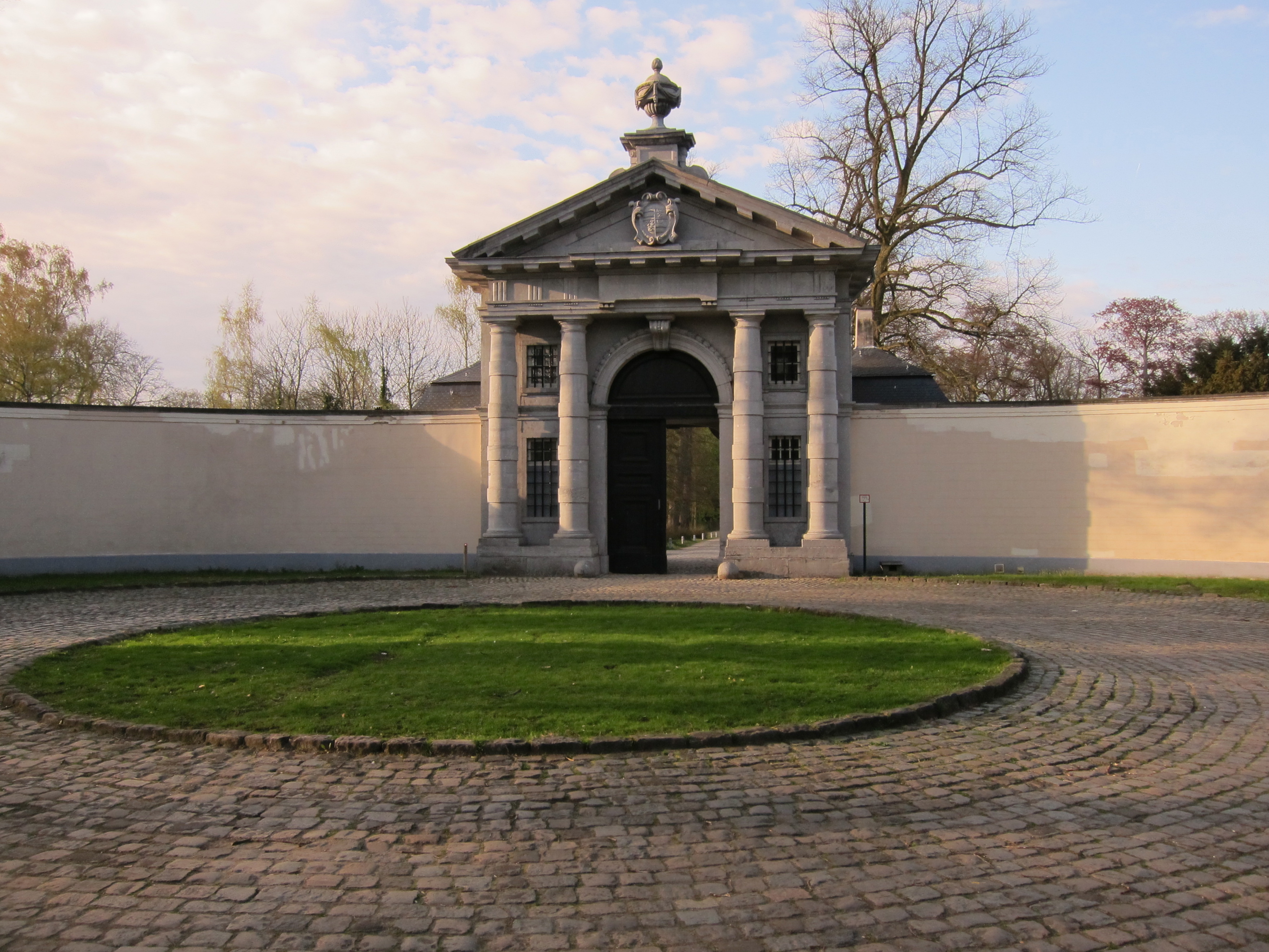
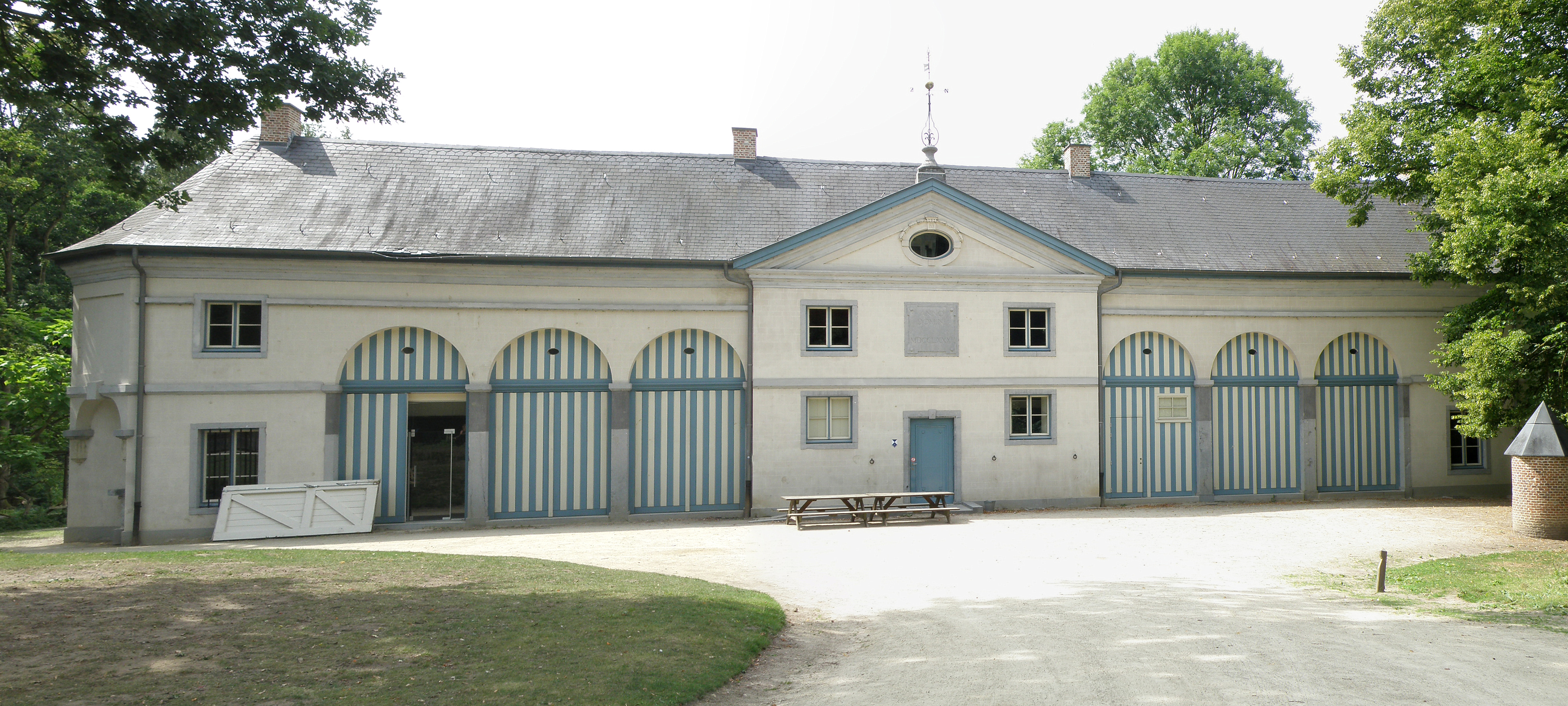
The gatehouse (top) and coach house (bottem) built by Haegens.

Haegens was elected unanimously in 1754 as the successor to Abbess Norberta de Berghe. She is considered an important benefactor of the Roosendael Abbey, commissioning the construction of farms and rectories (in Niel, Grobbendonk, Brecht) that were dependent on the Abbey. She also had a monumental gatehouse (1777) and a coach house (1781) built on the Abbey grounds. Faced with the threat of the Abbey's dissolution under the edict of Emperor Joseph II, she was forced to establish a boarding school to ensure the Abbey's survival.1703

Haegens died on 21 May 1787. Her remains were interred in the Waelhem cemetery.

After her death, she was succeeded in 1789 by Theresia de Coninck, the last abbess of Rozendaal before the Abbey was abolished by the French in 1797.

== Recognition ==
- Haegens had her own coat of arms.
- In 2024, the hamlet Elzestraat, where Roosendael Abbey is located, founded a neighborhood playground that is named after her, the Agnes Haegenshof.
- The gatehouse she built is nowadays a Belgian heritage site.

== See also ==
- Ida of Louvain
