= Alfred R. Voss Farmstead =

- U.S. National Register of Historic Places
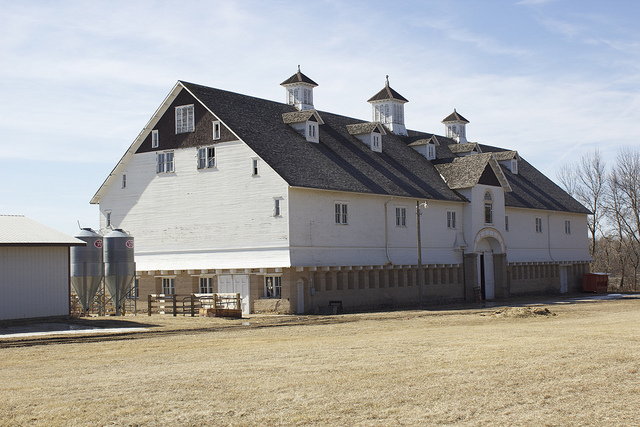
- The Voss Farmstead's stock barn, viewed from the northeast

- Location within Minnesota Location within the United States
- Location: County Highway 27, Rosendale Township, Minnesota
- Coordinates: 43°57′21″N 94°36′48″W
- Area: 8.26 acres (3.34 ha)
- Built: 1893–1920
- NRHP reference No.: 88002054
- Designated: October 27, 1988

The Alfred R. Voss Farmstead is a historic farm in Rosendale Township, Minnesota, United States. It was established in the early 1880s by Alfred R. Voss (1860–1952) and grew to become one of the largest private farming operations in late-19th-century southern Minnesota. Its stock barn, built 1893–1896, is one of the largest and most elaborate barns in the state. The farm was listed on the National Register of Historic Places in 1988 for its local significance in the themes of agriculture and architecture. It was nominated for its size, its unusually large and impressive buildings, and its associations with Voss, a land speculator instrumental in the settlement of Watonwan County and later one of the area's most prominent farmers.

== See also ==
- National Register of Historic Places listings in Watonwan County, Minnesota
