= Rossendale =

Rossendale may refer to several places and organizations in Lancashire, England:

== Places ==
- Rossendale Valley, a river valley
- Borough of Rossendale, a local government district
- Rossendale (UK Parliament constituency), a former parliamentary constituency

== Organizations ==
- Rossendale Bus, a bus company
- Rossendale RUFC, a rugby union team
- Rossendale F.C., a former football club
- Rossendale United F.C., a former football club

== See also ==
- Rosendale (disambiguation)
