= Rosendaël =

- Part of Dunkirk
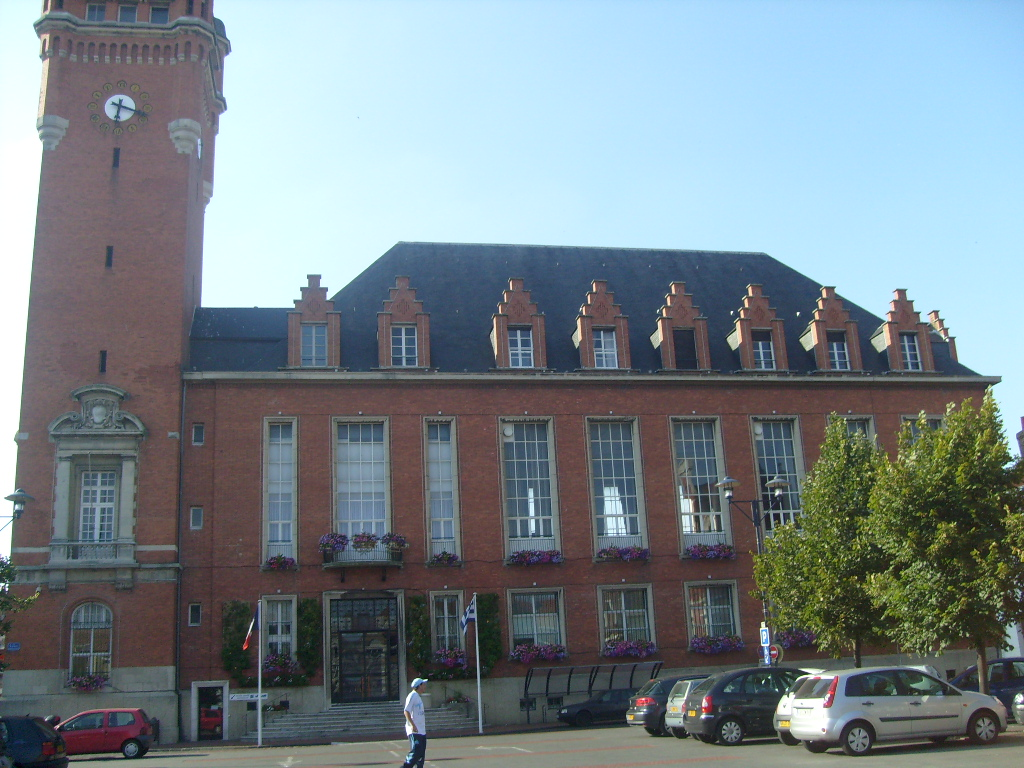
- Town hall annex

- Coat of arms
- Location of Rosendaël
- Location within France Location within Hauts-de-France
- Coordinates: 51°02′29″N 2°24′13″E
- Country: France
- Region: Hauts-de-France
- Department: Nord
- Arrondissement: Dunkirk
- Canton: Dunkerque-2
- Commune: Dunkirk
- Area^{1}: 3.97 km^{2} (1.53 sq mi)
- Population (1999): 18,272
  - Density: 4,600/km^{2} (11,900/sq mi)
- Time zone: UTC+01:00 (CET)
  - Summer (DST): UTC+02:00 (CEST)
- Postal code: 59240
- ^{1} French Land Register data, which excludes lakes, ponds, glaciers > 1 km^{2} (0.386 sq mi or 247 acres) and river estuaries.

Rosendaël (French pronunciation: [ʁozɑ̃dal]; Dutch: Rozendaal; West Flemish: Rozendoale; French Flemish: Roozendaele; meaning "rose valley") is a former commune in the Nord department in northern France. In 1971 it was merged into Dunkirk. It currently has 18,272 inhabitants (an almost ten-fold increase since 1825) in an area of 3.97 km^{2}.

== Heraldry ==
Arms of Rosendaël	The arms of Rosendaël are blazoned : D'azur à la Rose d'Argent

Rosendaël also has its own flag, Barry of 6 gules and vert

Grandes armes de Rosendaël.

Flag of Rosendaël

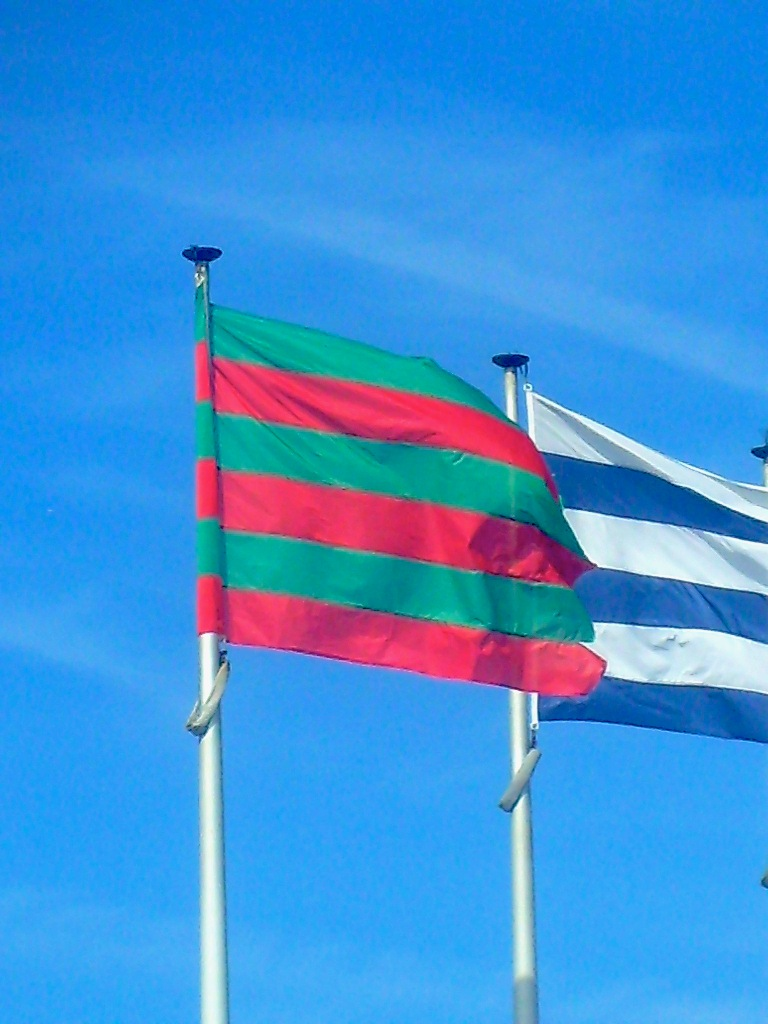
Flag of Rosendaëlsur dam

== See also ==
- Communes of the Nord department
- Roosendael Abbey in Antwerp, Belgium
- Roosendaal, city in North Brabant, Netherlands
- Rozendaal, South Holland, town in the Netherlands
- Rozendaal, town in Gelderland, Netherlands
- Jack Rosendaal (born 1973), Dutch decathlete
