= Ida of Louvain =

Ida of Louvain (died around 1300) was a Cistercian nun of Roosendael Abbey in the 13th-century Low Countries who is officially commemorated in the Catholic Church as blessed.

== Life ==
Ida was born into a well-to-do family in Leuven, Duchy of Brabant (now Belgium). At the age of 22 she felt a religious vocation but her father was a worldly man who would not accept this and subjected her to various forms of ill-treatment to discourage her. Despite parental disapproval, she first dedicated her life to God as an anchoress, and later became a nun in the recently founded Cistercian Abbey of Roosendael (the Valley of the Roses) in what is now Sint-Katelijne-Waver. One historian has described her as adding "éclat" to the monastery. The only contemporary record of her life is in a series of letters by her confessor, a priest named Hugo.

== Legend and veneration ==
Ida died with a reputation for sanctity and came to be considered a saint. She was said to have experienced stigmata and mystical graces. These included miraculous visions and corporeal encounters with appearances of the Infant Jesus, where she would hold him, bathe him, play with him and dress him. She was beatified for her piety and humility. Her official commemoration, granted by Pope Clement XI in 1719, is April 13.

== See also ==
- Agnes Haegens
