= Rosendale Township, Watonwan County, Minnesota =

Rosendale Township, Minnesota
- Township
- Location within the state of Minnesota Rosendale Township, Minnesota (the United States)
- Coordinates: 43°58′25″N 94°32′24″W
- Country: United States
- State: Minnesota
- County: Watonwan

Area
  - Total: 38.5 sq mi (99.6 km^{2})
  - Land: 38.2 sq mi (99.0 km^{2})
  - Water: 0.23 sq mi (0.6 km^{2})
- Elevation: 1,070 ft (326 m)

Population (2000)
  - Total: 357
  - Density: 9.3/sq mi (3.6/km^{2})
- Time zone: UTC-6 (Central (CST))
  - Summer (DST): UTC-5 (CDT)
- FIPS code: 27-55780
- GNIS feature ID: 0665467

Rosendale Township is a township in Watonwan County, Minnesota, United States. The population was 357 at the 2000 census.

Rosendale Township was organized in 1869, and named after Rosendale, Wisconsin, the former home of an early settler.

== Geography ==
According to the United States Census Bureau, the township has a total area of 38.4 square miles (99.6 km^{2}); 38.2 square miles (99.0 km^{2}) is land and 0.2 square mile (0.6 km^{2}) (0.57%) is water. The township contains one property listed on the National Register of Historic Places, the Alfred R. Voss Farmstead.

== Demographics ==
As of the census of 2000, there were 357 people, 120 households, and 99 families residing in the township. The population density was 9.3 people per square mile (3.6/km^{2}). There were 129 housing units at an average density of 3.4/sq mi (1.3/km^{2}). The racial makeup of the township was 97.48% White, 1.96% Asian, and 0.56% from two or more races. Hispanic or Latino of any race were 0.84% of the population.

There were 120 households, out of which 40.0% had children under the age of 18 living with them, 80.0% were married couples living together, 0.8% had a female householder with no husband present, and 16.7% were non-families. 15.0% of all households were made up of individuals, and 9.2% had someone living alone who was 65 years of age or older. The average household size was 2.98 and the average family size was 3.31.

In the township the population was spread out, with 28.6% under the age of 18, 7.6% from 18 to 24, 26.9% from 25 to 44, 22.4% from 45 to 64, and 14.6% who were 65 years of age or older. The median age was 39 years. For every 100 females, there were 104.0 males. For every 100 females age 18 and over, there were 114.3 males.

The median income for a household in the township was $45,000, and the median income for a family was $48,750. Males had a median income of $36,429 versus $27,917 for females. The per capita income for the township was $18,004. About 2.0% of families and 5.1% of the population were below the poverty line, including 9.6% of those under age 18 and none of those age 65 or over.
