= Battle of Nieuwpoort =

1600 Eighty Years War battle

- Part of the Eighty Years' War
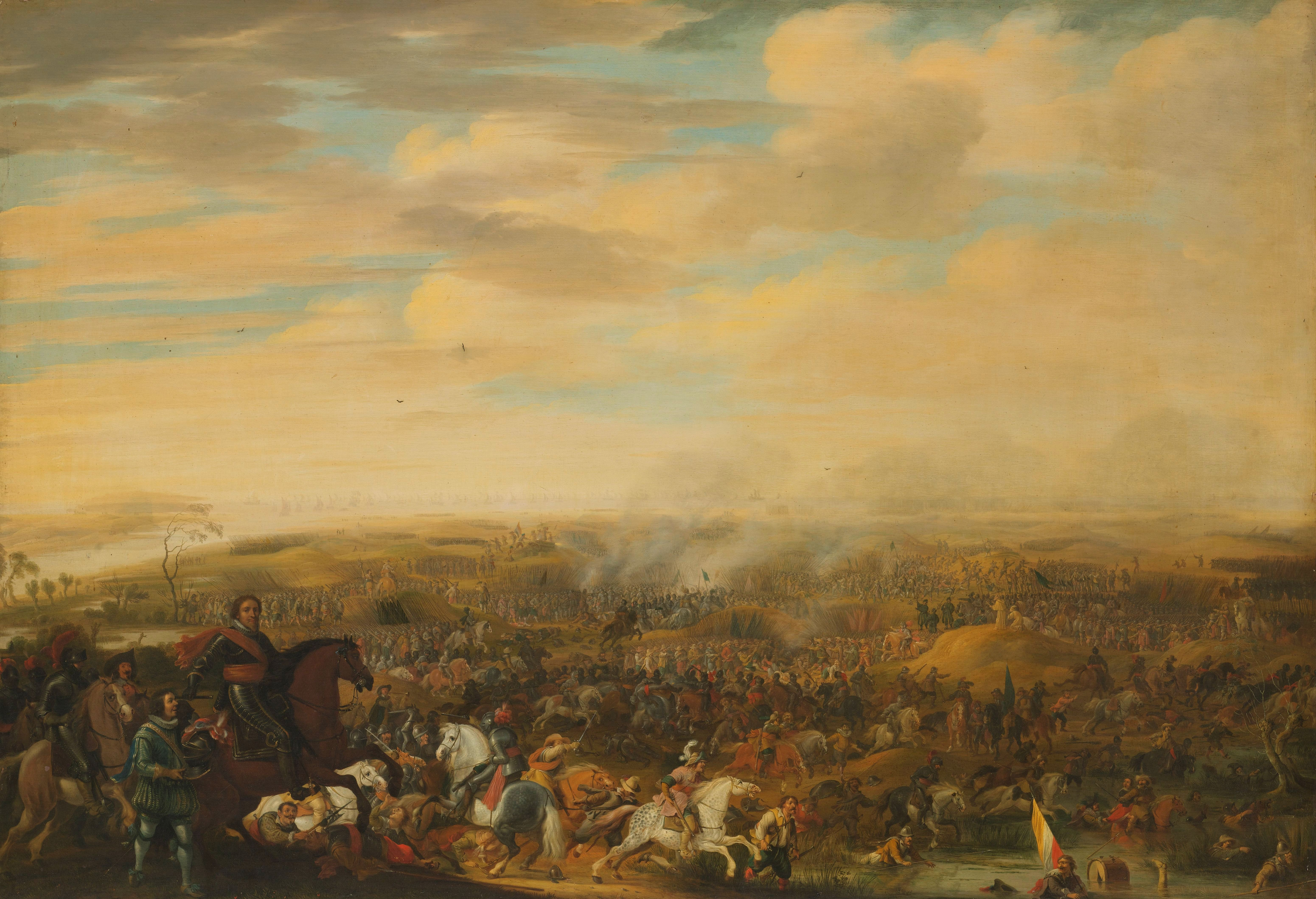
- Prince Maurice at the Battle of Nieuwpoort by Pauwels van Hillegaert. Oil on canvas
Date	2 July 1600
Location	Nieuwpoort (present-day Belgium) 51°9′21″N 2°44′18″E
Result	Dutch victory

Belligerents
Dutch Republic; England	Spain

Commanders and leaders
(Dutch Republic) Maurice of Nassau (Kingdom of England) Francis Vere	(Spain) Archduke Albert von Austria

Strength
10,000 infantry 1,400 cavalry 14 guns	10,000 infantry 1,200 cavalry 9 guns

Casualties and losses
1,700–2,700 dead or wounded	4,000 killed, wounded or captured

The Battle of Nieuwpoort (also known as the Battle of the Dunes) was fought on 2 July 1600 during the Eighty Years War and the Anglo-Spanish war in the dunes near Nieuwpoort. A Dutch army met a Spanish force head-on which, although their left flank nearly broke, were able to assail them with both infantry and cavalry. The Spanish gradually scattered in all directions and left their guns on the field.

== Background ==
The battle pitted the military leaders of both of the Netherlands (the Dutch Republic and the Habsburg Netherlands) against each other: The armies of the Dutch Republic were commanded by Maurice, Count of Nassau; the armies of the Habsburg Netherlands were commanded by Albert, Duke of Burgundy. Albert ruled autocratically, Maurice had to abide by the demands of the Dutch parliament. Both commanded multinational armies, though the Spanish army was entirely Catholic while the Dutch army was predominantly Protestant.

Maurice (1567–1624) was the son of the leader of the original Dutch rebellion, William of Orange. He had been fighting from an early age. During the previous five years, he had set in motion a military revolution by completely reforming the Dutch army, introducing new concepts of drill and standard commands, and combining them with standardization and thorough bookkeeping. This created a dependable, predictable, maneuverable and steadfast army, with high continuous firepower, deadly cavalry, and experienced officers high and low.

Albert (1559–1621) was son of Maximilian II, Holy Roman Emperor. His uncle, brother-in-law, and father-in-law was King Philip II of Spain. Albert ruled the Royal Netherlands with his spouse, Philip's daughter Isabella. He had little military experience. The Spanish army was as experienced as the Dutch, as were its officers, except for several of the highest in command. During Albert's absence in 1598–99, getting married in Spain, the Spanish army had been led by Mendoza, aka the Admiral of Aragón.

Ambition had grown Mendoza's army to beyond the territory's financial means. As a result, units had not been paid in a long time. Exacerbated by Albert's policy to promote bloodline over merit and to break up new regiments to reinforce older, mutiny had become commonplace. Several mutineer 'republics' had sprung up along the Dutch border, Diest the biggest. One new regiment even mutinied the moment it arrived from southern Europe and was told it would be broken up; it then camped around Hamont.

== To Dunkirk ==
Maurice used these setbacks to capture several important border forts. Chief among those was the brand new and very strong fort Crevecoeur (north of 's-Hertogenbosch, part of previous year's ambitious plans). Its men had mutinied but stayed loyal to the King of Spain. After a two month siege, and despite Spanish relief efforts, it surrendered in May 1600, with full honours intact. Maurice had offered them the pay they were still due by Spain, plus service in the Dutch army, all of which they accepted.

The relatively easy victory convinced the Dutch government to try something bigger. Dunkirk was the Spaniards main port in the north. It inflicted a lot of damage on Dutch merchants and fishermen. Maintaining a permanent blockade was quite expensive. Capturing it would also give the Dutch a bargaining chip with France and England. It was an ambitious target though and two earlier attempts (1594, 1595) to land an army close by had failed. A safer tactic was to use Dutch-held Ostend to the north as a base of operation. Only two obstacles remained between the two ports: Fort Albert just south of Ostend, and the port city of Nieuwpoort. It was decided to land an army right in front of Nieuwpoort, take it and the fort, and then march to Dunkirk.

The time was right for an operation deep inside enemy territory. Apart from Spanish mutiny issues, Ostend was being slowly encircled by forts. It was only a matter of time before Albert would lay siege to it: so using Ostend as a base was a matter of now or never. Maurice and the military didn't agree on Dunkirk however. They'd much rather focus on Sluis, the Spanish galley port north of Ostend. Maurice knew the area well, after landings in 1586, 1591, and two in 1593. Sluis was closer to the Republic and important to control the sea access of major trade centre Antwerp. The government overruled the military however: it was to be Dunkirk.

== Maurice's campaign ==
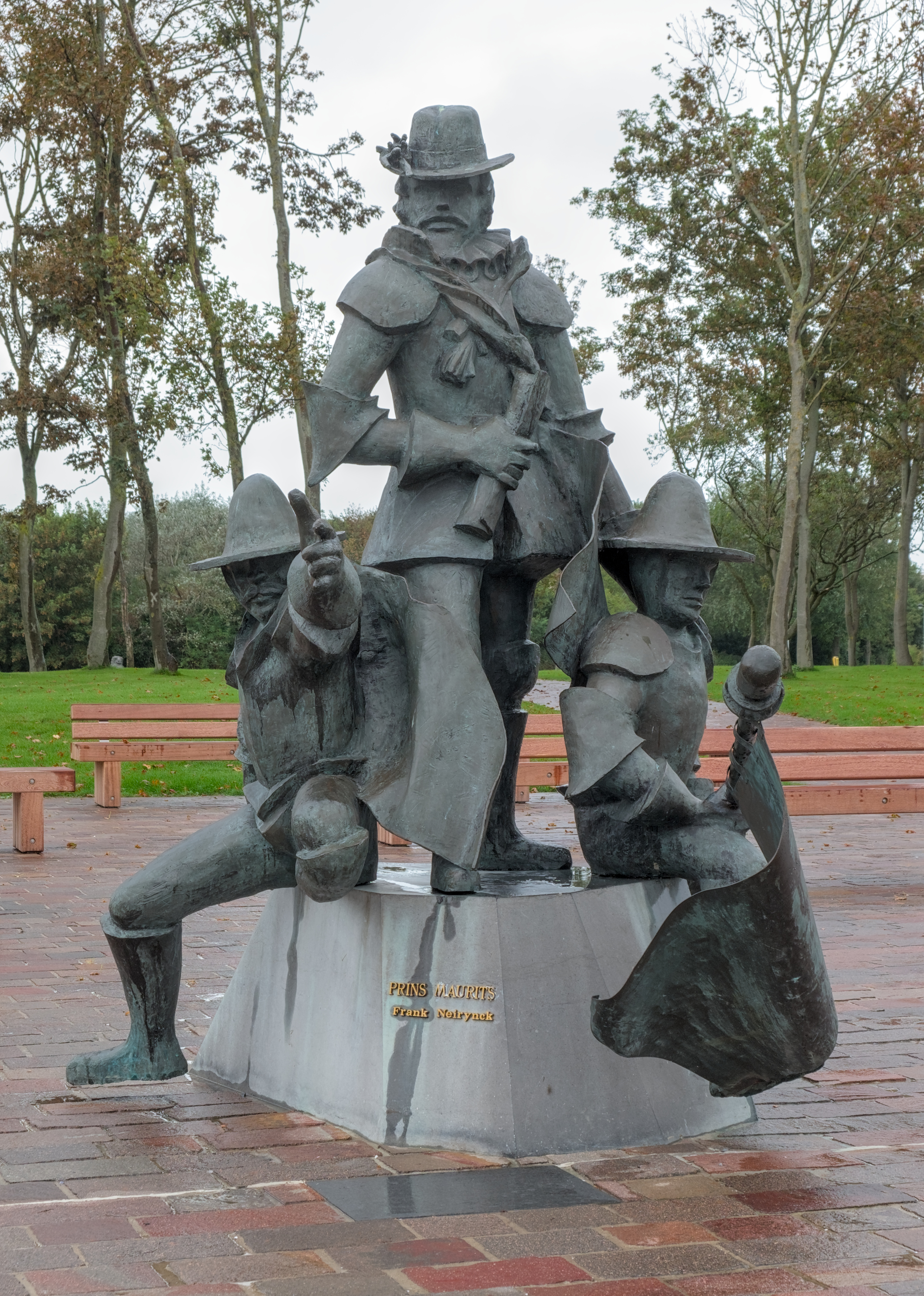
Prince Maurice memorial in Nieuwpoort

For this operation, by 21 June Maurice had collected an army of twelve infantry regiments and 25 troops of cavalry: some 12,000 Foot and 2,000 Horse. The following day he crossed the Scheldt Estuary in a multitude of small vessels and moved to Ostend, his base of operations; there he left a half regiment and four troops to reinforce the garrison and, on 30 June, started for Nieuwpoort.

When Maurice arrived in front of the place on 1 July, he sent two thirds of his force across the Yser River to blockade it from the West. That night, while he was making preparations for a regular siege, he received news that the Archduke was close at hand with a field army; knowing that he was cut off from his base, he ordered his cousin Ernst Casimir (Ernst Casimir I of Nassau-Dietz) to delay with a force the advancing Spanish troops, while he was bringing the best part of his army to cross again the Yser and rejoin the rest, to face the Archduke: he had no option left but to present battle, or risk a potentially disastrous retreat by sea.

Ernst Casimir - commanding the Edmonds (Scottish) and the Van der Noot (Dutch) regiments, together with four troops of cavalry and two guns - was ordered to seize the Leffinghen bridge but, as he arrived, he found the Spanish already in its possession; Ernst deployed his force behind a ditch, hoping to fight a delaying action, but the Spaniards were already in great strength across the bridge and charged right home, piercing his centre routing the infantry at once while his cavalry fled in panic. Over 600 Scots were killed, with five out of the twelve company commanders being killed on the field and another two executed by the Spanish afterwards. The Dutch fared only slightly better, taking refuge in Ostend: for all purposes, Ernst's command had ceased to exist.

After that cheap victory, the Archduke held a conference with his captains. Most urged to entrench the army across the road to Ostend, forcing Maurice to attack along a narrow front where the Dutch cavalry, mostly heavy, would not be effective against the lighter Spanish cavalry. However, the mutineers, who had been rallied by the Archduke on the promise of free plunder, were eager for a fight and out-argued the rest. The army therefore advanced in battle order along the coast; it was midday and the tide was coming in, so that in the end they were forced to abandon the shrinking beach and climb slowly up the slippery dunes. Maurice just had time to assemble his whole army to face the Archduke.

== Battle ==
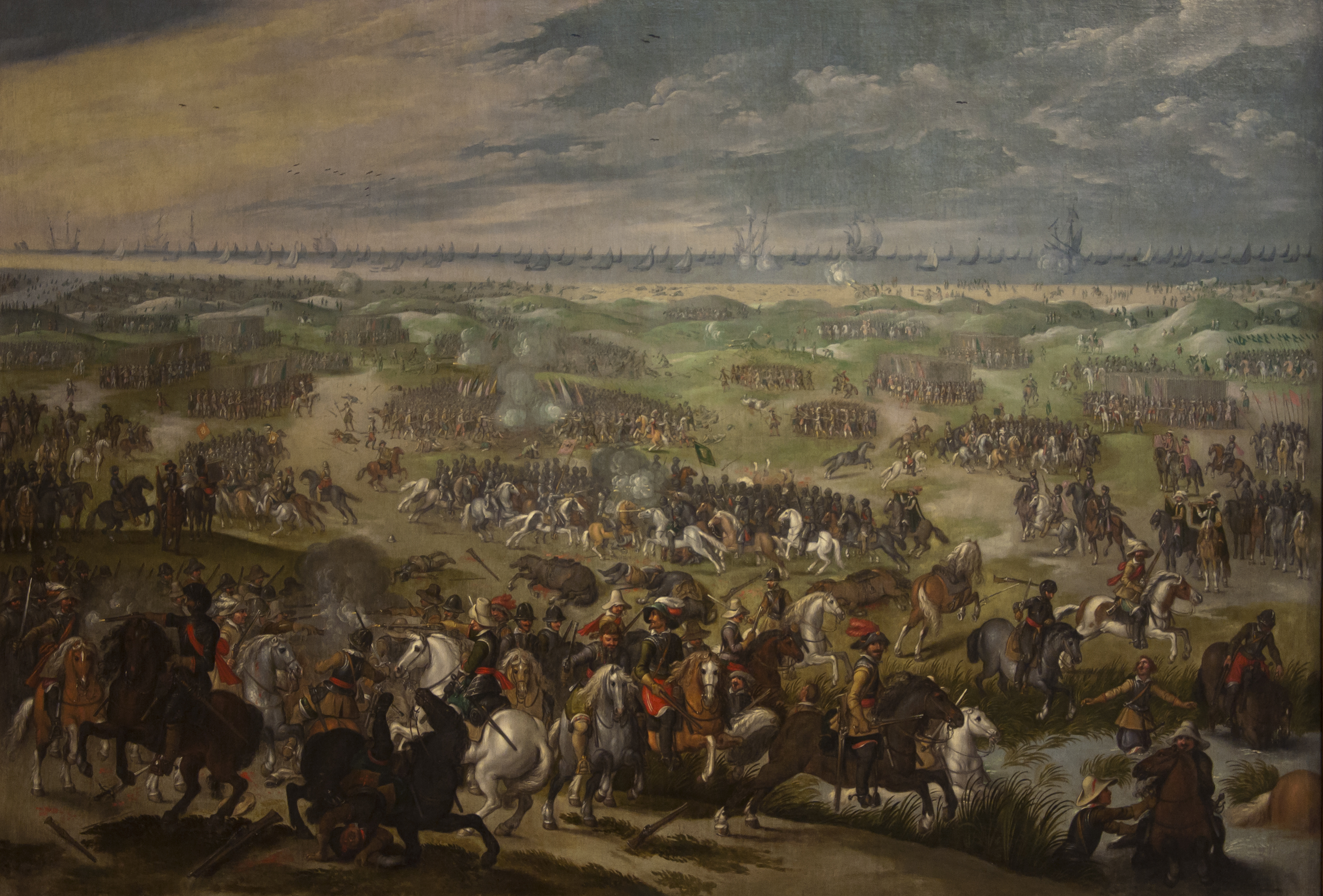
Battle of Nieuwpoort by Sebastian Vrancx.

Maurice had posted his best regiments in a strong defensive position on top of a stretch of dunes, with guns covering both flanks with enfilade fire. Under the command of the experienced Francis Vere the English, who composed of one third of the States Army (some twenty four companies in total) were the first line of infantry and were placed on this stretch of dunes, and awaited the Spanish army to arrive.

The Spanish sent a screen of 500 harquebusiers to cover their advance; but soon the two unruly mutineer regiments in the vanguard started the attack with a rash charge up the hill. They were repulsed in disorder, while the light cavalry, counter-charged by the Dutch cuirassiers, were routed. It was then time for the second line of the Spanish infantry to advance. The Sapena and Ávila Tercios made quick progress against the Frisian regiment on the Dutch right, and Maurice sent his entire second line to protect that sector, stabilising the front.

Meanwhile offshore an Anglo-Dutch fleet had moved close to the shore and bombarded the Spanish positions supporting the land forces. Maurice then sent his entire cavalry against the Spanish flank, except for the small body of cavalry in the second line that he kept in reserve behind the infantry. The Dutch cuirassiers easily routed the lighter Spanish cavalry, and the mutineer cavalry, that had just rallied, fled the battlefield never to return. However, the Dutch were checked by the Spanish third line of infantry, supported by some guns, and retreated with heavy losses.

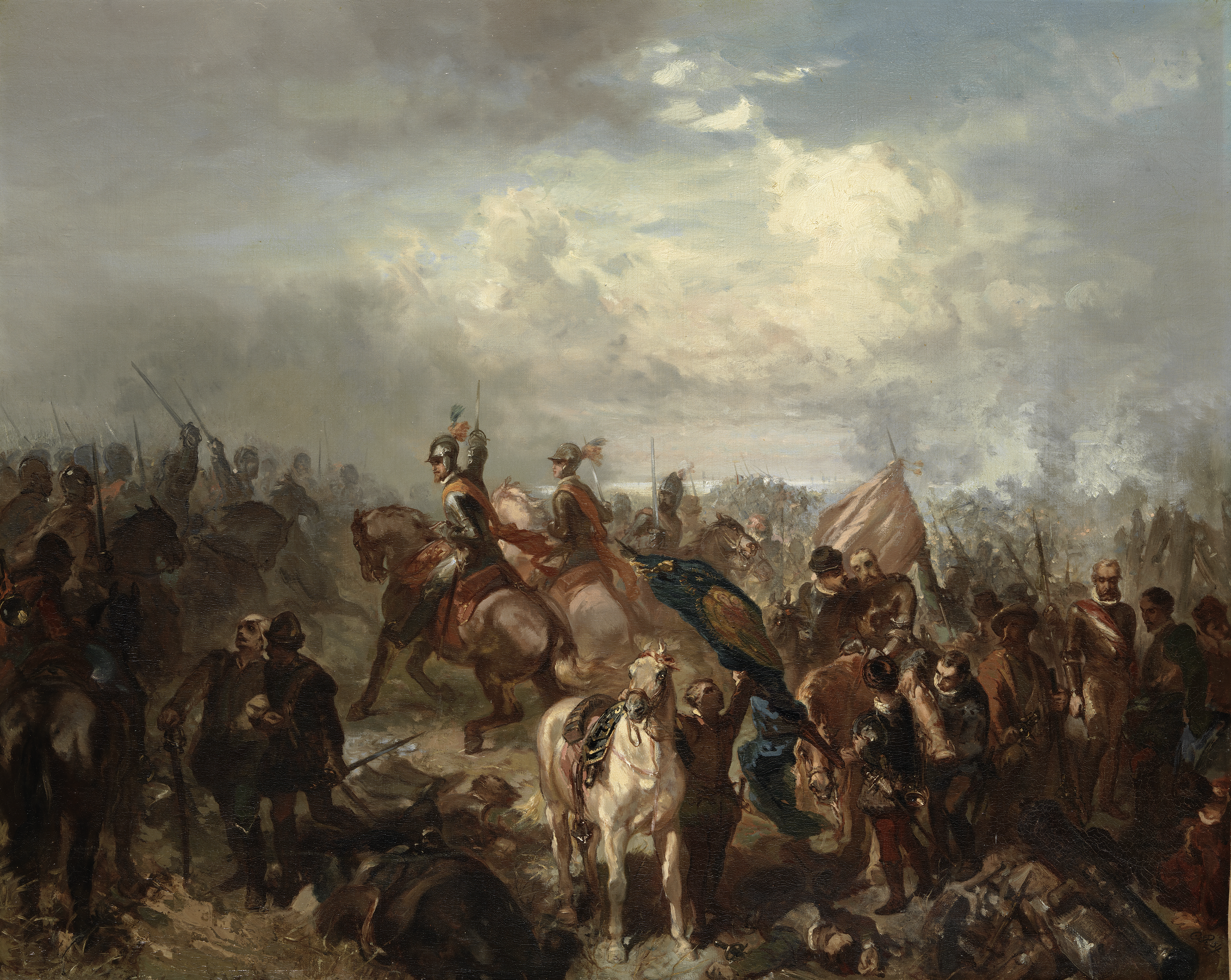
Maurice and his younger brother, Frederick Henry, at the battle of Nieuwpoort

Meanwhile, on the Dutch left, the English regiments faced the veteran tercios of Monroy and Villar; the elite of the Spanish infantry. The English, well drilled in Maurice's new tactics, kept a rolling fire on the Spaniards who advanced up the slope at a steady pace, covered by a screen of skirmisher harquebusiers. The fight was even for a time, until it came to the push of pike, the Spanish finally dislodging the English from the top of the hill. Francis Vere, seeing the risk of a disordered collapse of the English line, asked for reinforcements, but they did not arrive in time and the English were finally routed. However, the Spanish, exhausted after a day of fighting and marching on difficult terrain, pressed their advantage very slowly. Even more dangerously, they were disordered, with musket and pike units mixed. Noticing this, Maurice sent his reserve cavalry against them, only three troops strong. Their well-timed charge was unexpectedly very successful. The Spanish were thrown into confusion and started a slow retreat. Vere, who had been able to rally some English companies behind a battery, joined the fight, and he was reinforced by the regiments in the third line that had finally arrived. Finally Vere sent his own cavalry against the Spanish who were now heavily assailed and retreated in disorder.

On the Dutch right, the Archduke had committed his third line into the assault. Maurice saw his chance and asked his tired cavalry for one last effort. Under the command of his cousin Louis, another charge was delivered and the Spanish cavalry was finally driven from the field. The Spanish infantry, already engaged at the front, was this time unable to repulse the attack on their flank and started to give ground. After a while, the front crumbled and, one after another, all units were running in confusion, leaving behind their guns. The survivors scattered in all directions, but the inactivity of the Dutch garrison in Ostend allowed the Spanish army to avoid total destruction.

== Aftermath ==
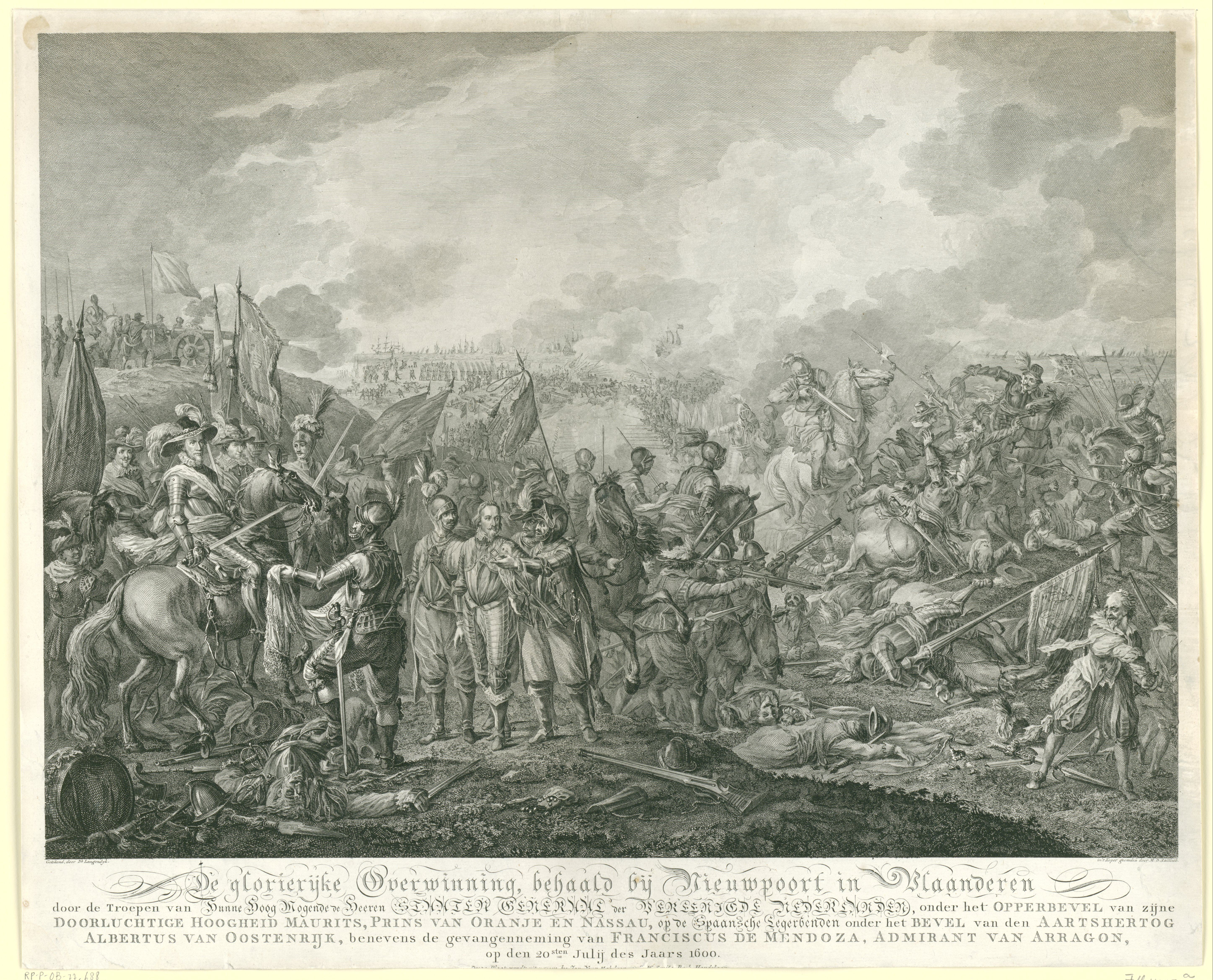
Maurice wins the battle at Nieuwpoort, 1600 showing the capture of Francisco de Mendoza, Admiral of Aragón

Spanish losses were high; in total from 2,500 to 4,000 killed and wounded and included some 600 taken prisoner. Many officers were lost and casualties were suffered by the elite units of the second line, veteran soldiers who were very hard to replace. The artillery train was also lost, while 90 Spanish standards were captured, while the Scots and Zeeland colours lost at Leffinge were recaptured. Allied losses were also high - they amounted from 1,700 to 2,700 - these included the casualties at Leffinge. English forces who bore the brunt of the Spanish attack suffered heavy losses of nearly 600 men, but was proof to the Dutch of their reliability in battle.

Maurice's army remained in Nieuwpoort for fourteen days, and although his army had driven a Spanish army from the field, a rare feat at the time, the battle achieved little beyond that. The Dutch did not proceed to occupy or even invest Dunkirk, which had been the principal objective of the campaign. Their lines of communication had already been stretched to the limit and Maurice was soon forced to withdraw from the territory of the Spanish Netherlands. The Flemish, whom Maurice had hoped to rally to his revolt, proved loyal to the Spanish monarchy. Dunkirkers would continue to prey on Dutch and English trade. Instead the allied army proceeded to Ostend, where it captured a large Spanish fort named 'Isabella'.

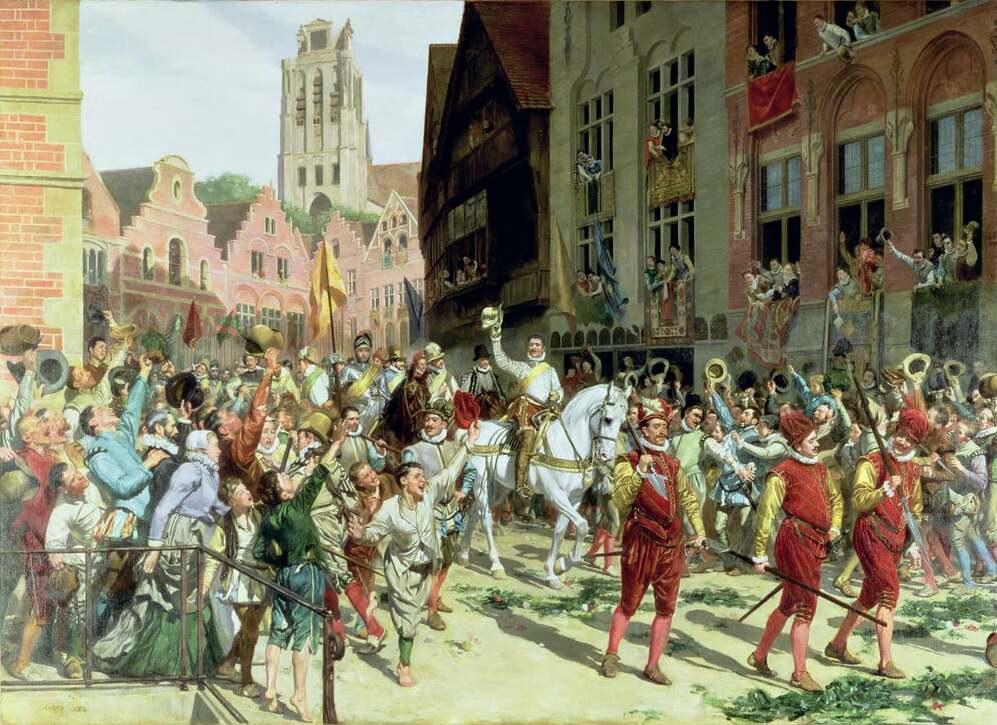
The Triumphal Arrival in Rotterdam of Maurice of Nassau after the Battle of Nieuwpoort

Strategically, the lesson drawn from this battle was that it was more advantageous to besiege and capture towns than to attempt to win in the open field. This would increasingly characterise operations in the Eighty Years' War thenceforth. While Maurice's army had beaten a Spanish army, his reformed infantry had been dislodged from a strong defensive position by the Spanish infantry using its traditional methods, and it was only his cavalry that had saved him from defeat. The Battle of Nieuwpoort is considered to be the first challenge to the dominance of the tercios in sixteenth and seventieth century warfare. Spanish experts were quick to notice Maurice's innovation in tactics - furthermore there was even an adoption in the increase of light mounted troops in the Spanish army.

News of the victory reached England; Elizabeth I was overjoyed - she repeatably said to her courtiers that Vere was, 'the worthiest captain of our time'. In addition several ballads entertained the English public after news of victory had broken. Meanwhile Isabella bore disappointment on news of the defeat but was relieved to find that her husband the Archduke had escaped the rout.

== Order of battle ==
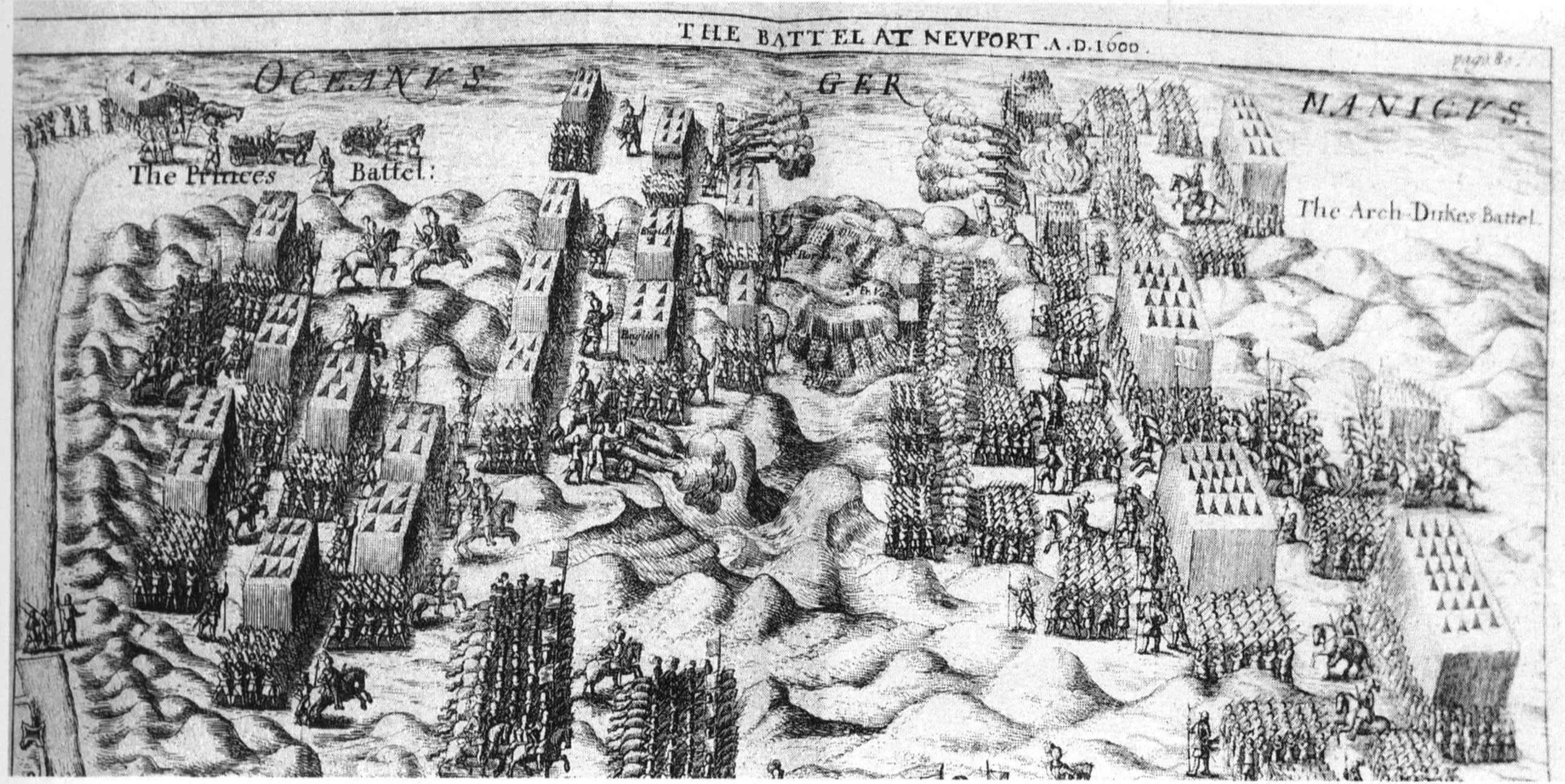
Battle deployment from Vere's Commentaries.

=== Dutch States Army ===
1st Line
Horace Vere Regiment (English)
Francis Vere Regiment (English)
Hertinga Regiment (Frisian, it was double-sized regiment, with 19 companies, including two companies of Maurice's own Foot Guards)
6 troops of Cuirassiers
3 troops of Light Cavalry

2nd Line
Domerville Regiment (French Huguenot mercenaries)
Swiss Battalion (4 mercenary companies)
Marquette Regiment (Walloon regiment composed entirely of Spanish deserters)
6 troops of Cuirassiers

3rd Line
Ernst Casimir I of Nassau-Dietz Regiment (German, lieutenant-colonel Huysmann in command)
Hurchtenburch (Dutch)
Ghistelles (Dutch, 6 companies strong, as the others had been left in Ostend to reinforce the Garrison)
3 troops of Cuirassiers

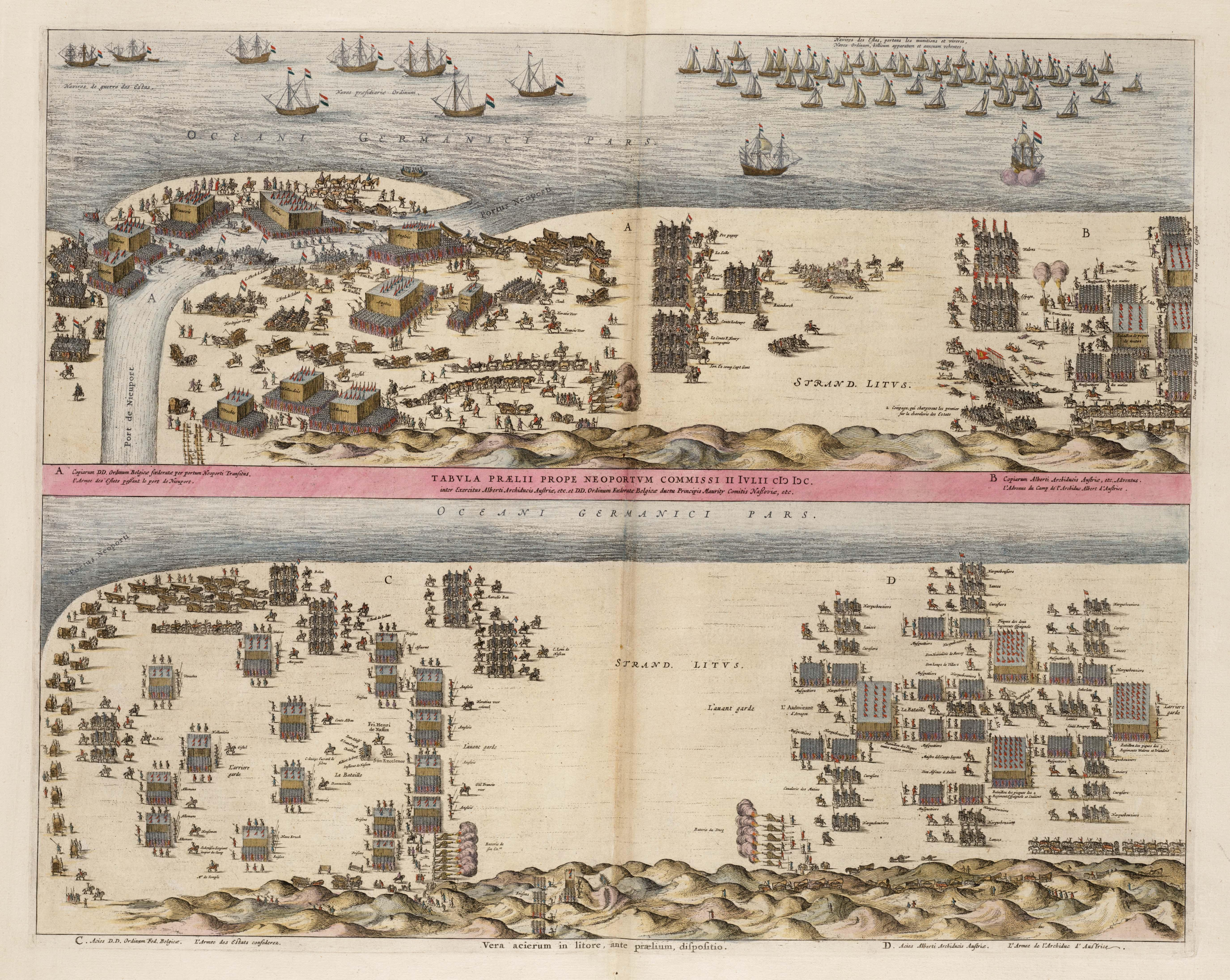
Battle at Nieuwpoort, 1600. Two phases of the battle depicted.

=== Spanish Army ===
1st Line
1st Provisional Tercio (Spanish)
2nd Provisional Tercio (Walloon)
7 troops of light cavalry

2nd Line
Monroy Tercio (Spanish)
Villar Tercio (Spanish)
Sapena Tercio (Spanish)
Avila Tercio (Italian)
1 troop of Light Lancers
5 troops of Cuirassiers

3rd Line
La Barlotte Tercio (Walloon)
Bucquoy Tercio (Walloon)
Bostock Regiment (English deserters and reinforced by English Catholics)
6 troops of Light Cavalry

== Early deployment ==
North flank:

Anglo-Dutch: 14 guns, 650 English musketeers.
Spanish: 9 guns, 50 cavalry, 400 infantry.

South flank:

States: 1,200 riders
Spanish: 1,000 riders

Center:

States: 9,350 infantry
Spanish: 7,300 infantry
