= RKVV Roosendaal =

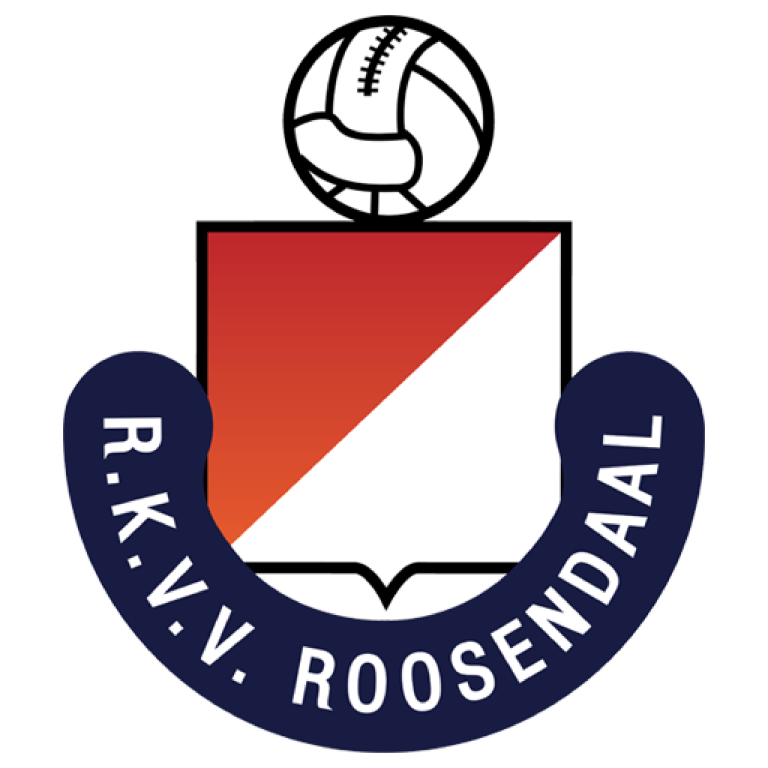
- Logo of RKVV Roosendaal
- Full name: Rooms Katholieke Voetbalvereniging Roosendaal
- Founded: 1935
- Ground: Sportpark Hulsdonk
- League: Tweede Klasse
- Website: rkvvroosendaal.nl

RKVV Roosendaal is a football club founded on 1 August 1935. RKVV Roosendaal plays in the Tweede Klasse (7th division of Dutch football).

== History ==
RKVV Roosendaal was founded on 1 August 1935, by a fusion of rivaling clubs DOVA and SDOR, first named RKSV before later changing to RKVV. The color choice was based on the 2 colors of Roosendaal: red and white.

Their first trophy was reached in 1954, when they were promoted to the Tweede Klasse. Later in 1961, they were promoted to the Eerste Klasse. The season after they immediately got relegated to the Tweede Klasse. Until the early 60s, they played behind a café at the Kade, just outside the center of Roosendaal. They stopped playing there after the 1960s when a neighborhood was being built, and without a replacement, the old field had to go. When they didn't have a field, they played at the fields of fellow Roosendaal football clubs RBC and BSC. In 1964 they got a new field at Sportpark Hulsdonk, where they still play to this day.

Between 1965 and 1971, they played in the Derde Klasse (except in 1968 in the Tweede Klasse). Between 1972 and 1982, they played in the Vierde Klasse and after that the club swung between the Derde Klasse and the Tweede Klasse.

In 1971 the first women's team was created. Their first season was in 1972-1973. They won their first trophy the following season.

== Amateur trophies ==
7x Derde Klasse

3x Tweede Klasse

1x Eerste Klasse

2x Vierde Klasse

== Field ==
They have played at Sportpark Hulsdonk since 1964. The location is Sportstraat 17, Roosendaal. They share their field with DVO '60. The Gemeente Roosendaal owns the field.
