= Leffinge =

Section of Middelkerke, Belgium

Coordinates: 51°11′N 2°53′E

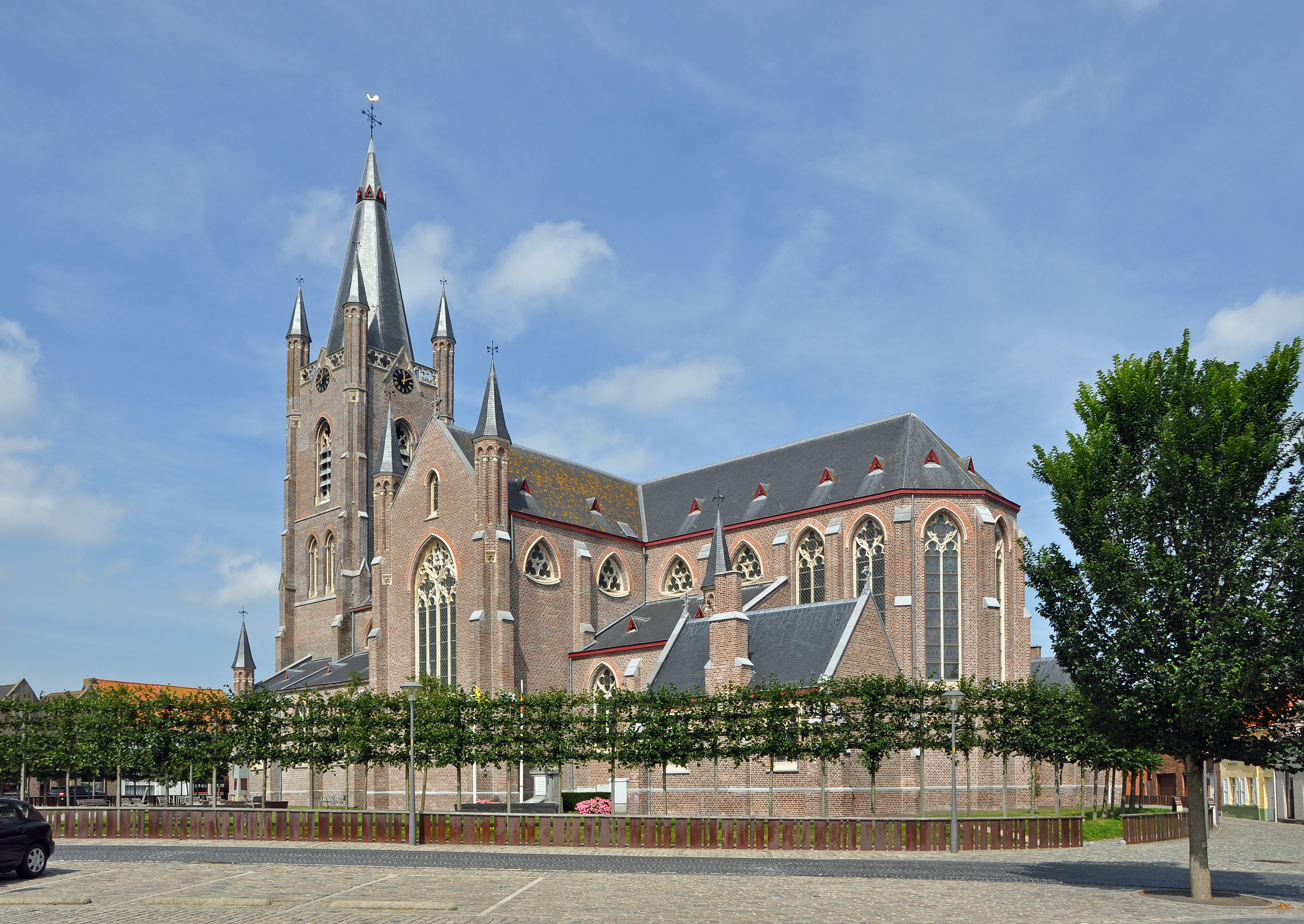
Church of Our Lady, Leffinge

Leffinge, sometimes Leffingen in English, is a historic village in Belgium, now part of the municipality of Middelkerke, province of West Flanders.

== History ==
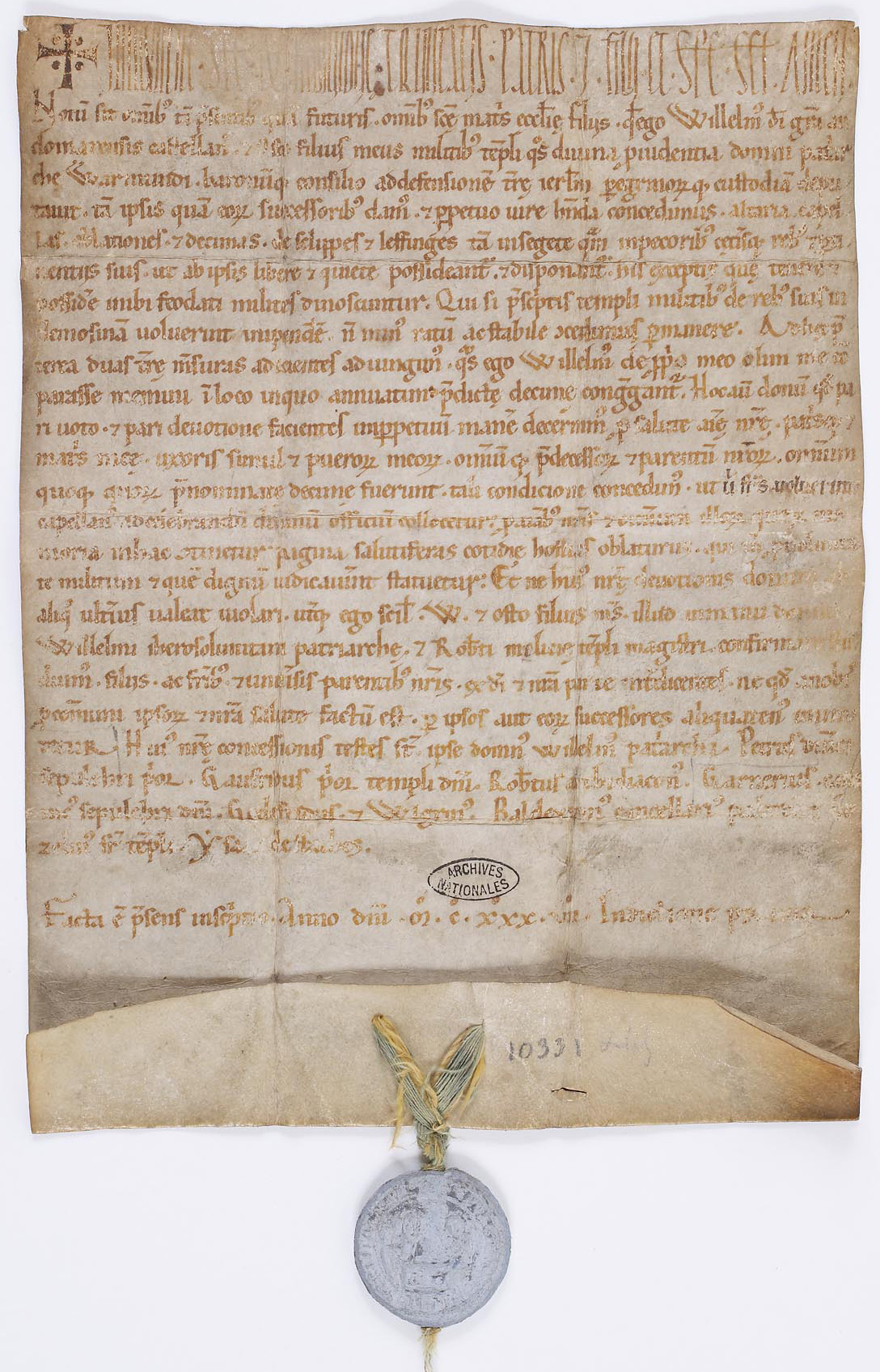
Charter confirming the gift of the church in Leffinge to the Order of the Temple, 1137

In 1137 the castellan of Saint-Omer confirmed the gift of the church in Leffinge to the Knights Templar. The medieval church was damaged in 1488, repaired around 1500, and demolished in 1857. The current neo-Gothic church was built 1877-1879 and restored in 1983.

A preliminary action of the Battle of Nieuwpoort (1600) was fought in Leffinge, in which Scottish mercenaries in Dutch service particularly distinguished themselves.
