= Rosendal =

Rosendal may refer to:

== People ==
- Gunnar Rosendal, a Swedish Lutheran priest

== Places ==
=== Denmark ===
- Rosendal, a manor house in Faxe, Denmark
- Rosendal, a demolished country house in Copenhagen

=== Norway ===
- Rosendal, Norway, the administrative center of Kvinnherad municipality in Vestland county, Norway
- Barony Rosendal, a historic estate and manor located in Rosendal, Norway

=== South Africa ===
- Rosendal, Free State, a small farming town in the Free State province, South Africa

=== Sweden ===
- Rosendal Castle, Helsingborg, a castle in Helsingborg Municipality, Scania province, Sweden
- Rosendal Palace, a palace in Djurgården in Stockholm, Sweden

=== United States ===
- Rosendal, United States Virgin Islands, a village on the island of Saint Thomas in the United States Virgin Islands

== See also ==
- Roosendaal
- Rosendahl
- Rosendale (disambiguation)
