= Rosenthal (disambiguation) =

Rosenthal is a surname.

Rosenthal may also refer to:

== Places ==
=== Australia ===
- Rosenthal, South Australia
- Rosenthal Heights, Queensland, a locality in the Southern Downs Region
- Shire of Rosenthal, a former local government area in Queensland, Australia

=== Canada ===
- Rosenthal, Edmonton, a neighborhood

=== Czech Republic ===
- Rosenthal, the former German name for Rožmitál pod Třemšínem in the Czech Republic

=== Germany ===
- Rosenthal (Berlin), a part of Berlin, Germany
- Rosenthal, Hesse, in the Waldeck-Frankenberg district
- Rosenthal am Rennsteig, a municipality in the district Saale-Orla-Kreis, in Thuringia, Germany
- Rosenthal, a part of Rosenthal-Bielatal in the Sächsische Schweiz district, Saxony
- Rosenthal, a part of Ralbitz-Rosenthal in Bautzen district, Saxony

=== Poland ===
- Rosenthal, the former German name for Bartoszyce, Poland

=== Slovenia ===
- Rosenthal, the former German name for Rožna Dolina in Slovenia

== Other uses ==
- 100268 Rosenthal, an asteroid
- Rosenthal (company), a German porcelain manufacturer

== See also ==
- Rosendahl (disambiguation)
