= Rosendale =

Rosendale may refer to:

== Places ==
=== United Kingdom ===
- Rosendale Road in West Dulwich, South London

=== United States ===
- Rosendale, Missouri, a city
- Rosendale, New York, a town
  - Rosendale Village, New York
- Rosendale, Wisconsin, a village
- Rosendale (town), Wisconsin, an unincorporated community
- Rosendale Township, Minnesota

== People ==
- Matt Rosendale (born 1960), American politician
- Adam Rosendale (active 2017), American politician

== See also ==
- Rossendale (disambiguation)
