= Nicolaas Roosendael =

Dutch painter (1634–1686)

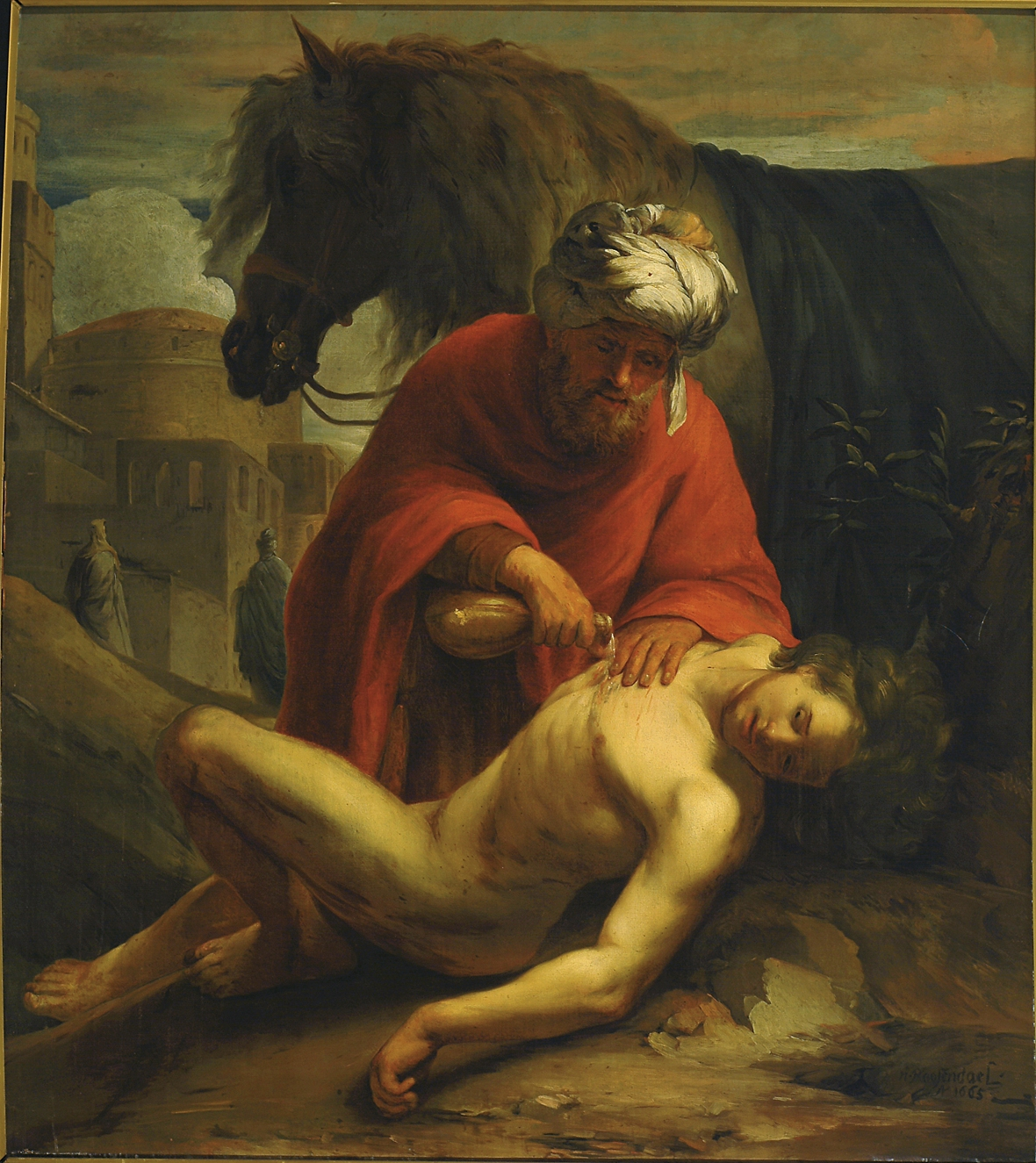
The good Samaritan heals the traveller, 1665

Nicolaas Roosendael (1634–1686) was a Dutch Golden Age painter.

== Biography ==
Nicolaas Roosendael was born in 1634 in Hoorn, Dutch Republic. According to Houbraken, he was the companion of Jacob Toorenvliet on his trip to Italy, but it is unknown whether he joined the bentvueghels with him or not.

According to the RKD, he travelled to Rome in 1670. On his return he settled in Amsterdam, where he made many pieces for the Begijnhof Chapel.

He died in 1686 in Amsterdam.
