= Rozendal =

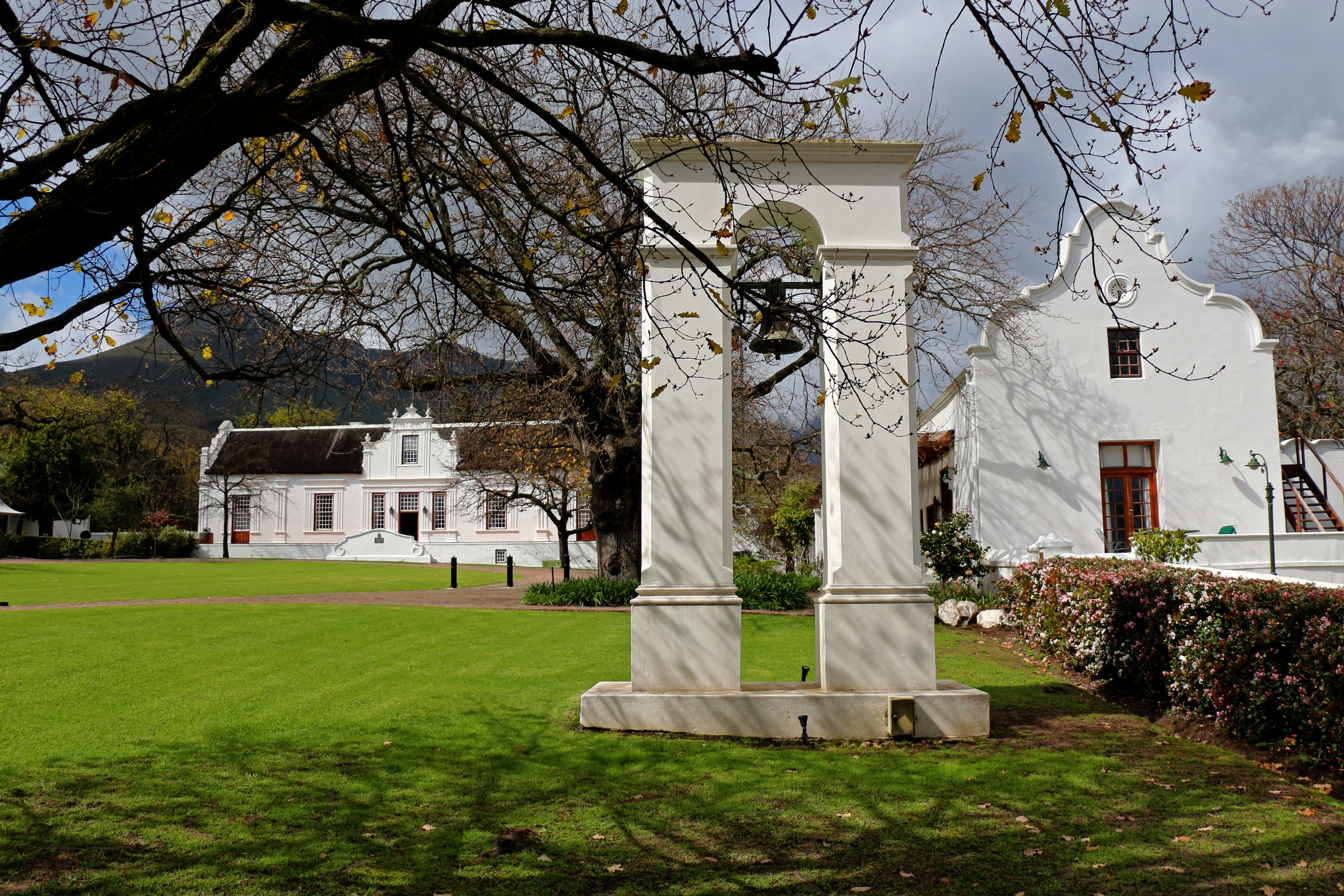
- Lanzerac Wine Estate near Rozendal.

- Location within Western Cape Location within South Africa
- Coordinates: 33°55′59″S 18°53′31″E
- Country: South Africa
- Province: Western Cape
- District: Cape Winelands
- Municipality: Stellenbosch

Area
  - Total: 0.26 km^{2} (0.10 sq mi)

Population (2011)
  - Total: 824
  - Density: 3,200/km^{2} (8,200/sq mi)

Racial Makeup (2011)
  - White: 92.1%
  - Coloured: 5.0%
  - Other: 3.3%

First Languages (2011)
  - Afrikaans: 79.9%
  - English: 14.2%
  - Other: 5.8%
- Time zone: UTC+2 (SAST)
- Postal code (street): 7600
- Area code: 021 887

Rozendal is a residential suburb of Stellenbosch since roughly the early 1970s. It forms the eastern border of the town together with Karindal. Stellenbosch is the second-oldest town in South Africa after Cape Town. The well-known Lanzerac Hotel and winery is a stone's throw away and the road to Jonkershoek passes by the suburb.
