= Rozendaal =

- Municipality
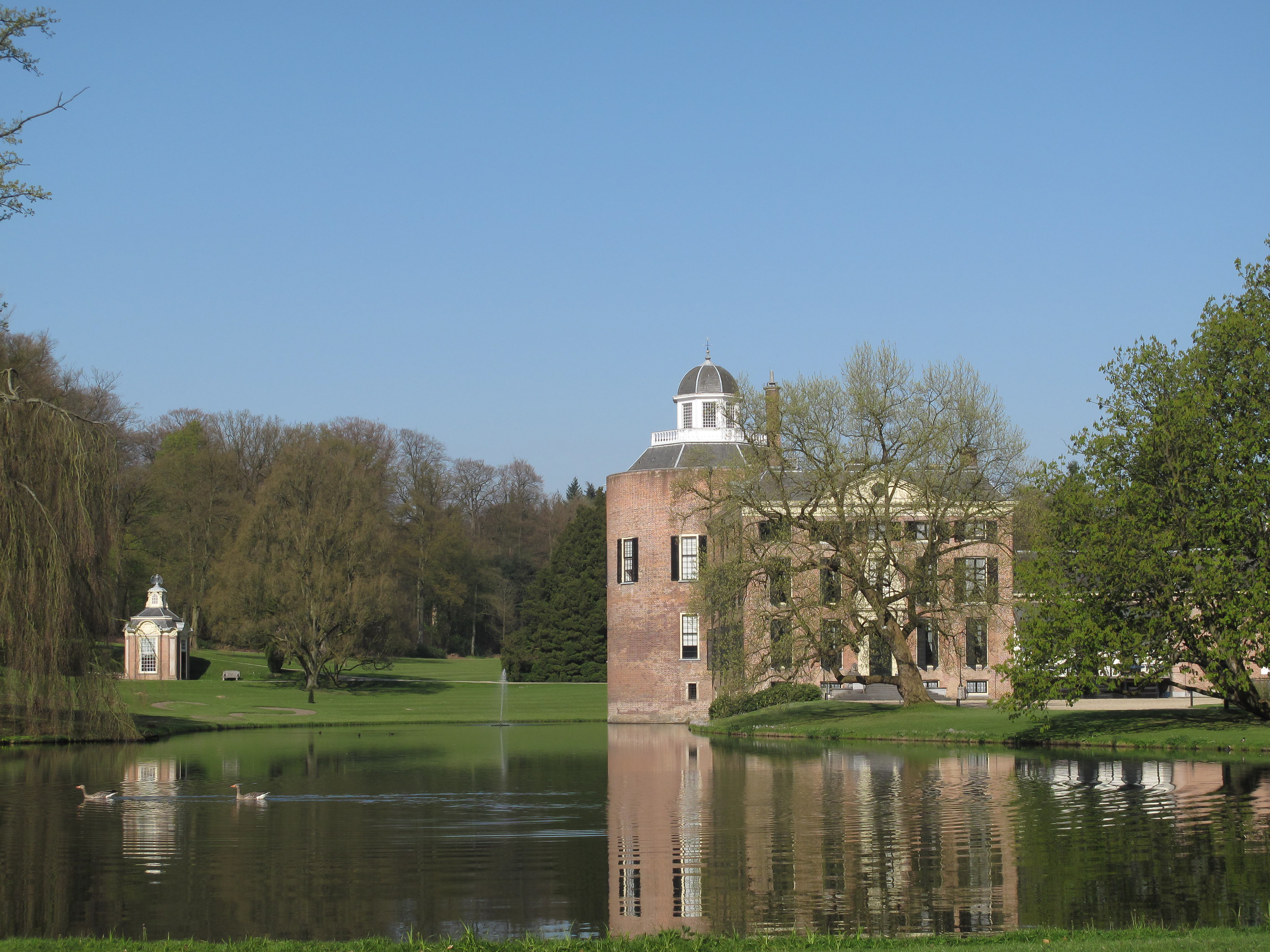
- Rozendaal Castle

- Flag Coat of arms

- Location in Gelderland
- Coordinates: 52°0′N 5°58′E
- Country: Netherlands
- Province: Gelderland

Government
  - Body: Municipal council
  - Mayor: Ester Weststeijn

Area
  - Total: 27.92 km^{2} (10.78 sq mi)
  - Land: 27.90 km^{2} (10.77 sq mi)
  - Water: 0.02 km^{2} (0.0077 sq mi)
- Elevation: 41 m (135 ft)

Population (January 2021)
  - Total: 1,726
  - Density: 62/km^{2} (160/sq mi)
- Time zone: UTC+1 (CET)
  - Summer (DST): UTC+2 (CEST)
- Postcode: 6891
- Area code: 026
- Website: www.rozendaal.nl

Rozendaal (Dutch pronunciation: [ˈroːzə(n)daːl]) is a municipality and a town in the eastern Netherlands, in the province of Gelderland. The town, next to Arnhem and Velp, is known for the Rozendaal Castle (Kasteel Rosendael) and its water fountain follies (bedriegertjes).

The municipality is the least densely populated on the mainland of the Netherlands, i.e., in effect, not on one of the West Frisian Islands. Rozendaal is one of the richest municipalities in the Netherlands.

== Population centres ==
- Imbosch
- Rozendaal
- Terlet

=== Topography ===
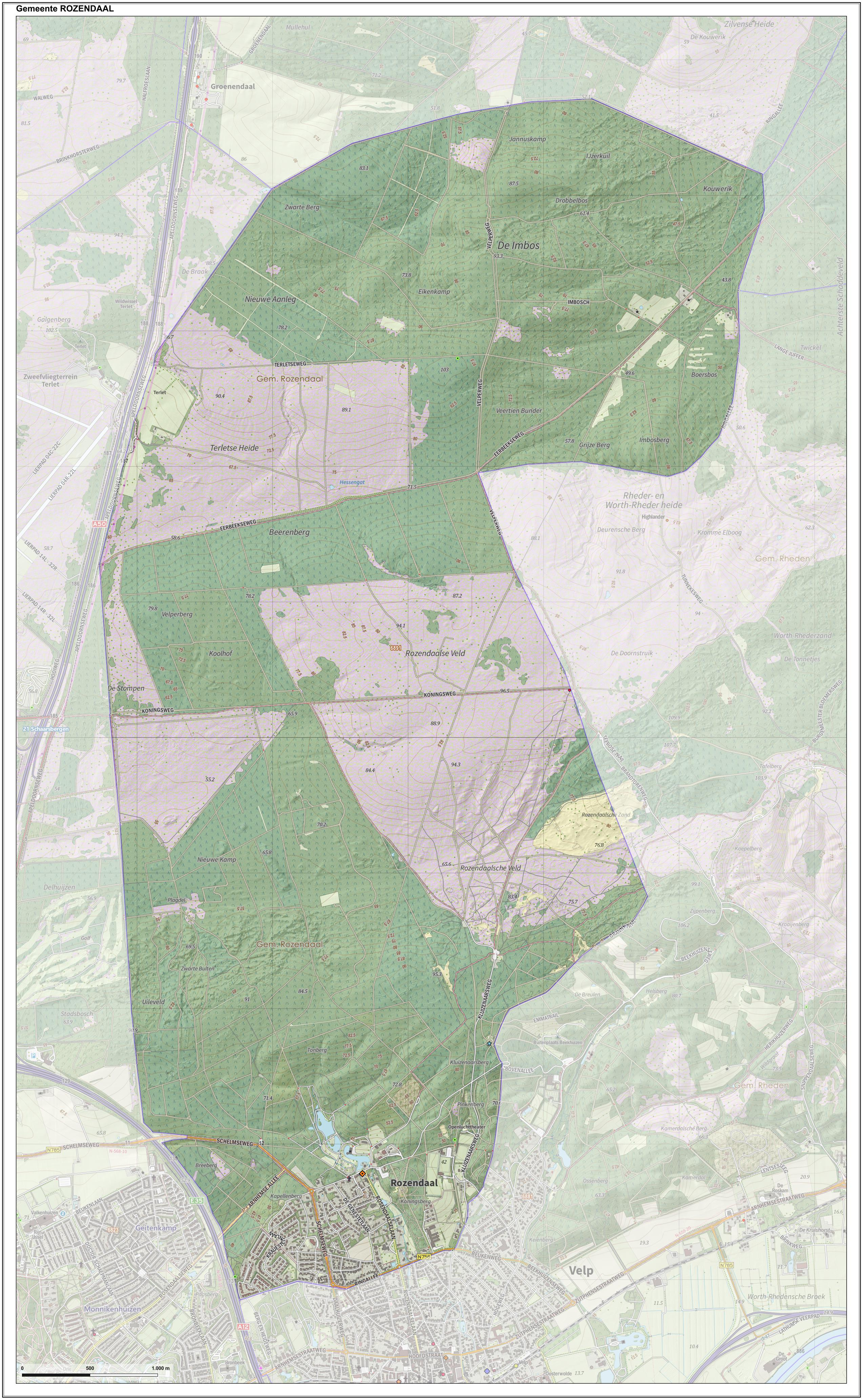

Dutch topographic map of the municipality of Rozendaal, June 2015

== Notable people ==
- Petrus Augustus de Génestet (1829 – 1861 in Rozendaal) a Dutch poet and theologian

== Gallery ==
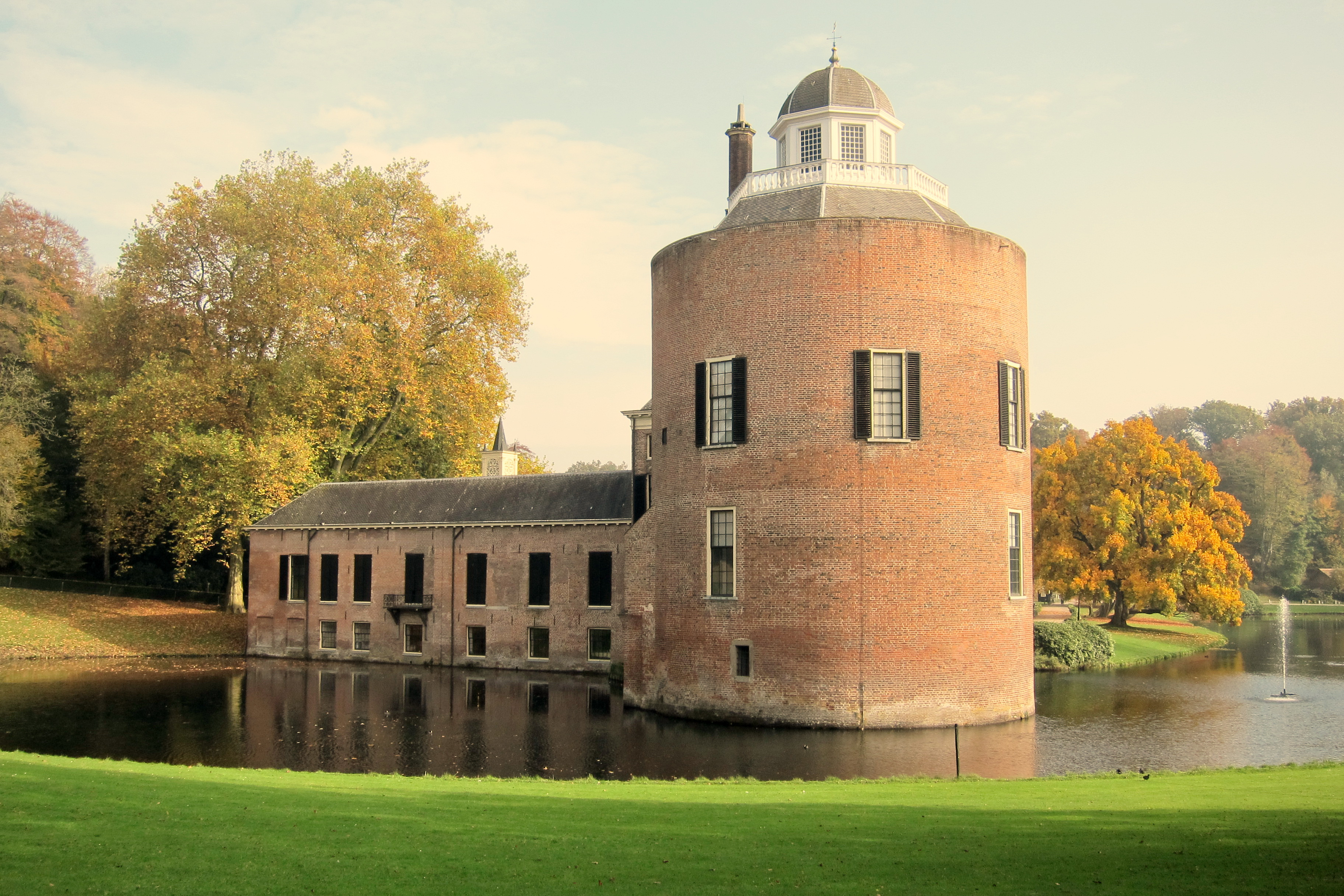
Tower of castle Rozendaal

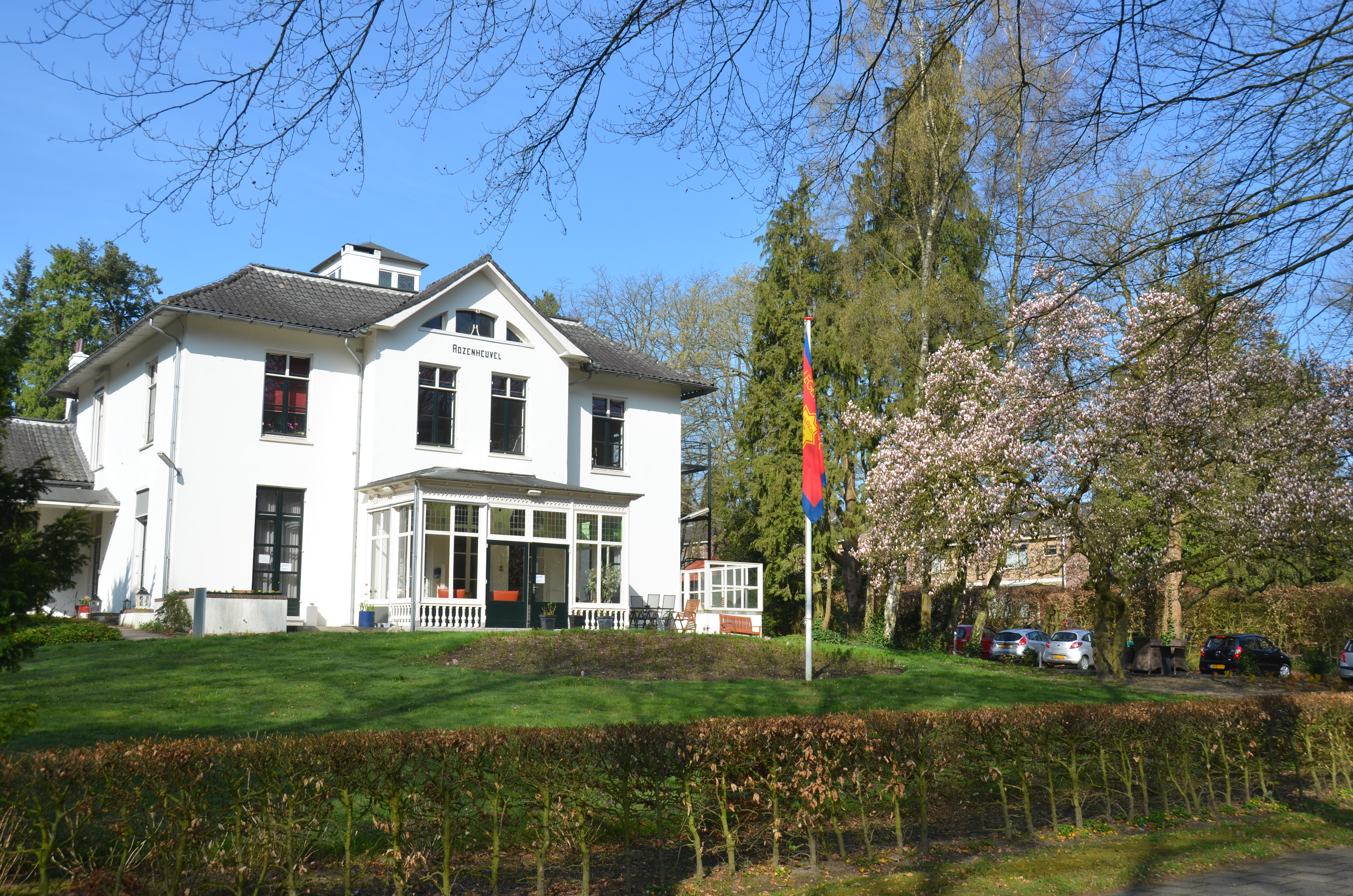
The Salvation Army Hospice Rozenheuvel at Rozendaal

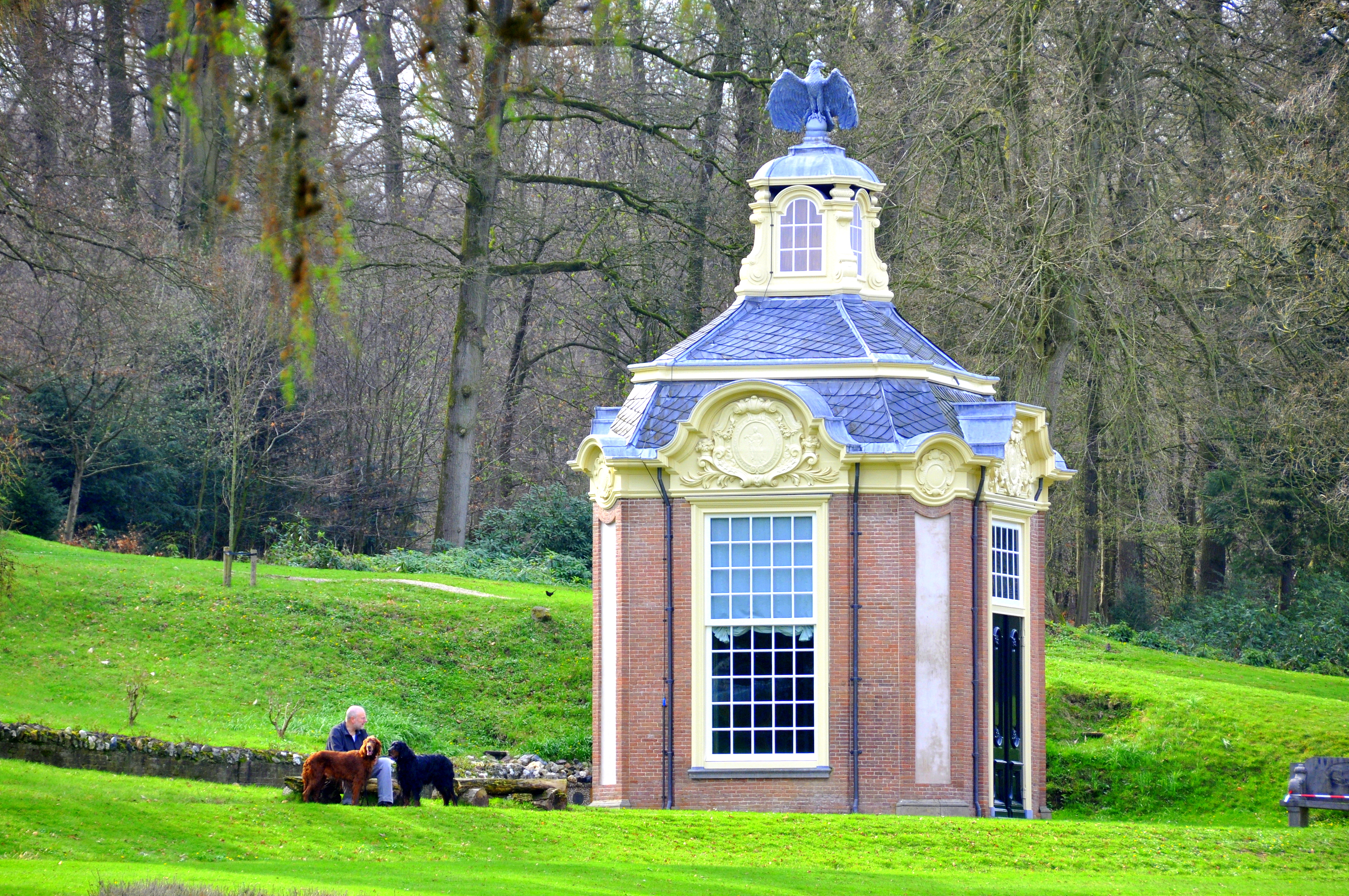
Theehuis, Rozendaal Park

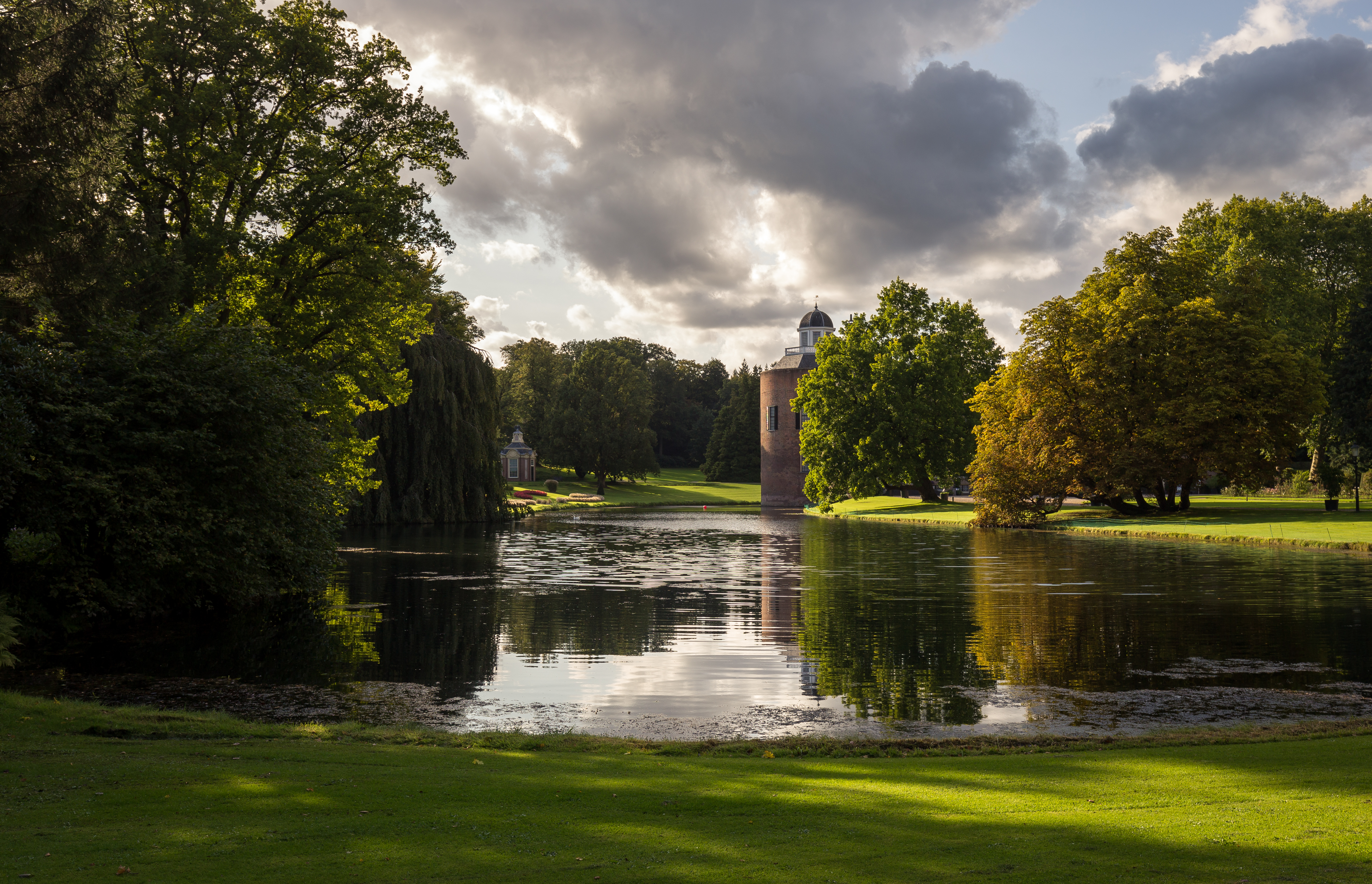
Kasteel Rosendael seen from one of the ponds

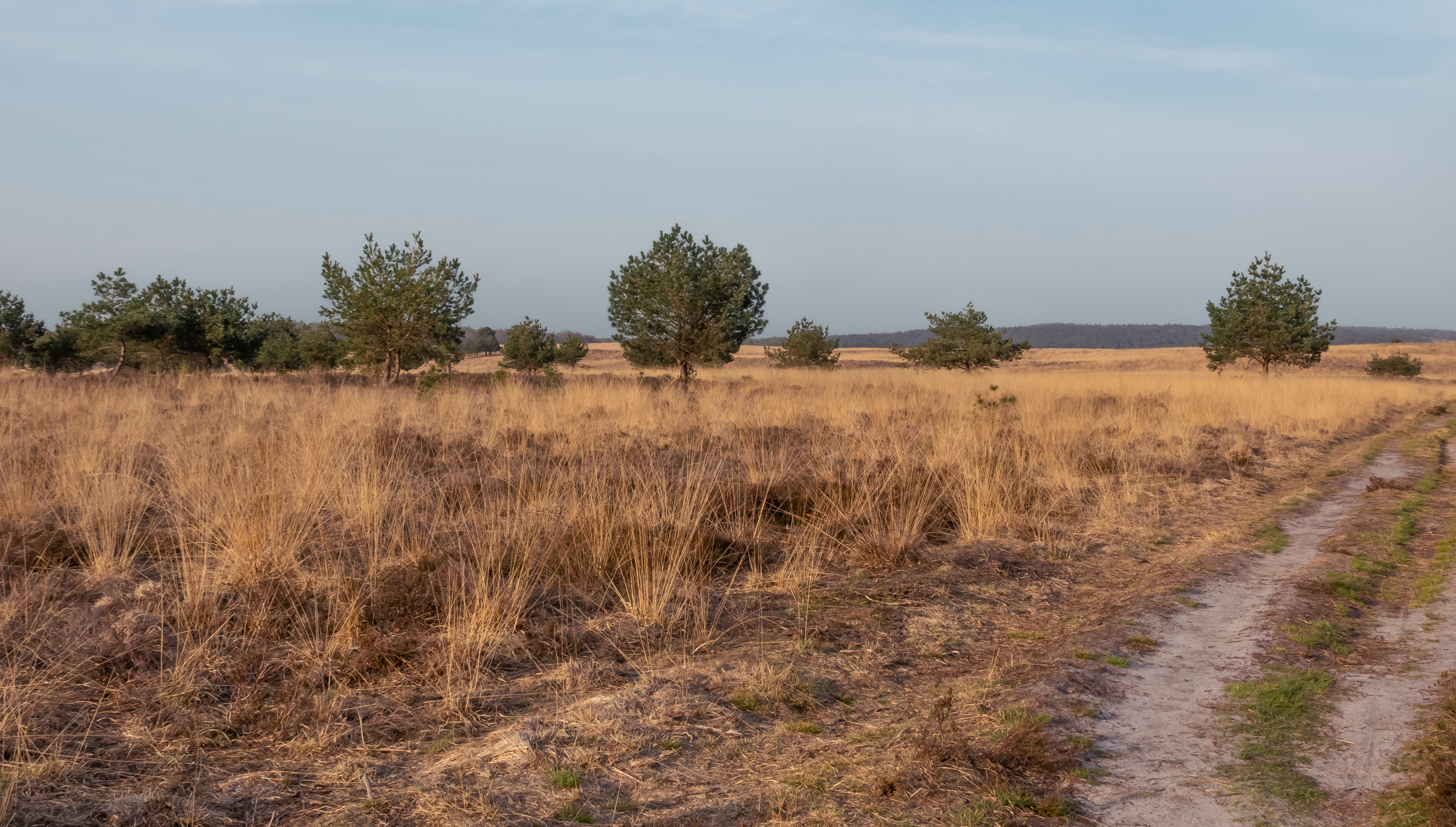
Rozendaals Veld near the Brandtoren

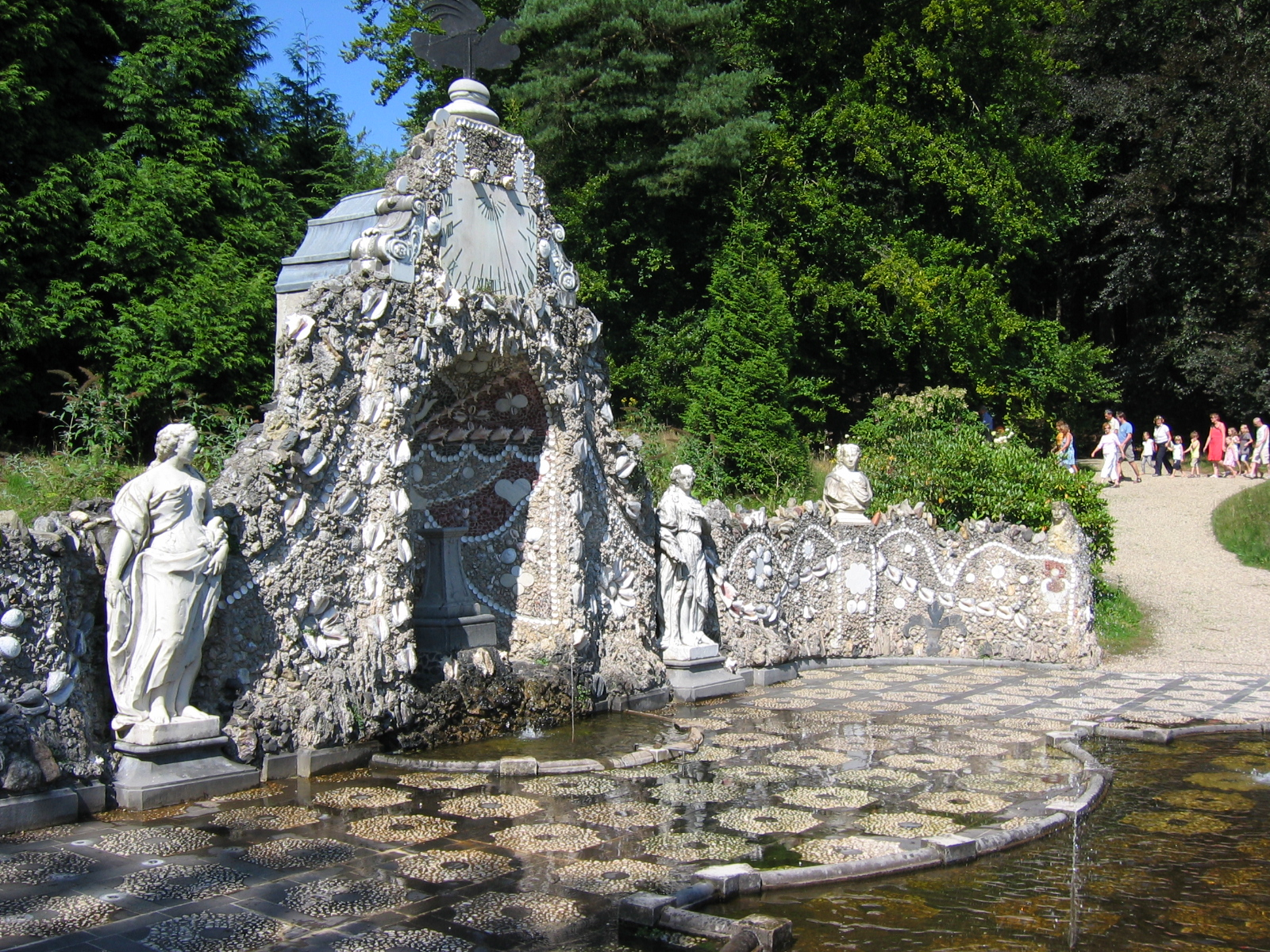
The bedriegertjes in the Rozendaal Castle parks

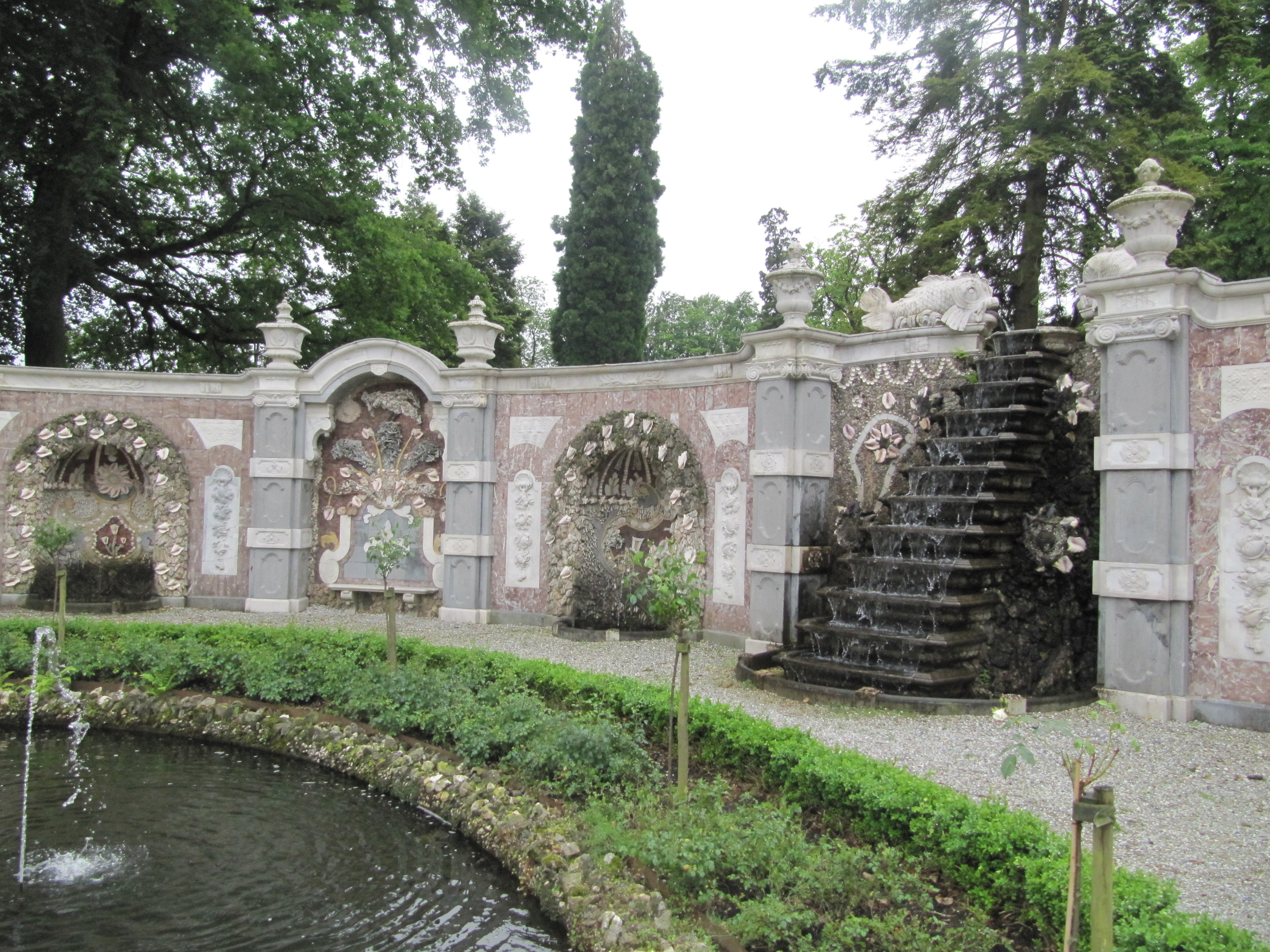
The schelpengalerij (shell gallery) in the Rozendaal Castle parks

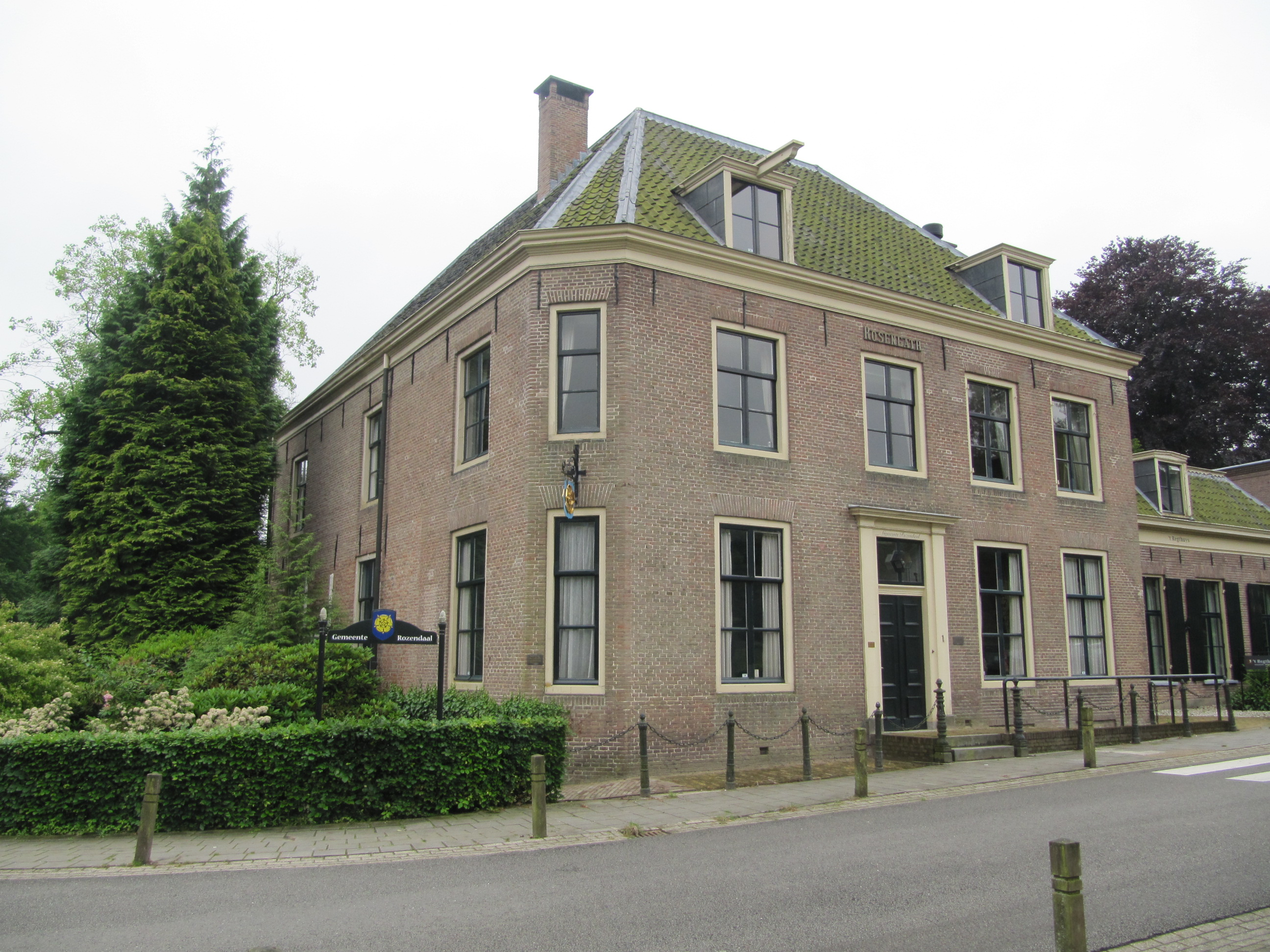
The town hall of the Rozendaal Municipality
