= Rozendaal, South Holland =

Rozendaal
- Town
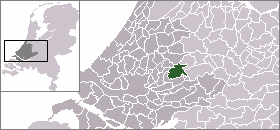

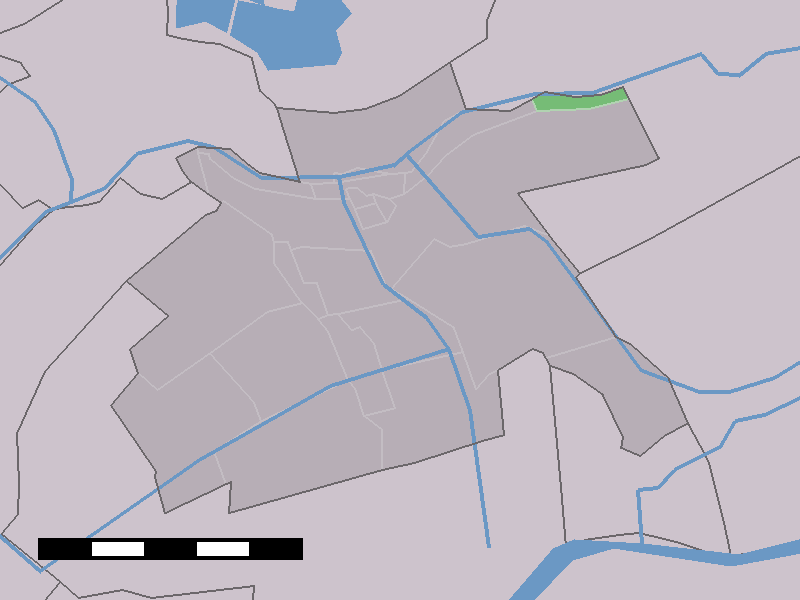
- The village (dark green) and the statistical district (light green) of Rozendaal in the municipality of Vlist.
- Coordinates: 52°1′N 4°50′E
- Country: Netherlands
- Province: South Holland
- Municipality: Vlist

Population (January 1, 2005)
  - Total: 90
- Time zone: UTC+1 (CET)
  - Summer (DST): UTC+2 (CEST)

Rozendaal is a town in the Dutch province of South Holland. The town is a part of the municipality Vlist. It and lies about 8 km south of Woerden.

The statistical area "Rozendaal", which also can include the surrounding countryside, has a population of around 90.
