= Rosendahl (disambiguation) =

Rosendahl is a municipality in the district of Coesfeld in the state of North Rhine-Westphalia, Germany.

Rosendahl may also refer to:

- Rosendahl Design Group, a company
- Rosendahl bend (a.k.a. Zeppelin bend), a general purpose bend knot

== People ==
- Andreas Rosendahl (1864–1909), Danish chess master
- Ann-Janeth Rosendahl (born 1959), Swedish cross country skier who competed in the early 1980s
- Bill Rosendahl (1945–2016), American politician
- Björn Rosendahl (born 1956), Swedish orienteering competitor
- Carl Otto Rosendahl (1875–1956), botanist (author abbreviation Rosend.)
- Charles E. Rosendahl (1892–1977), decorated Vice Admiral in the United States Navy
- Eric Rosendahl (born 1950s), Canadian politician
- Hans Rosendahl (1944–2021), Swedish former swimmer
- Heide Rosendahl (born 1947), retired German athlete
- Henrik Viktor Rosendahl (1855–1918), Swedish physician, pharmacologist, and botanist (author abbreviation H.Rosend.)
- Ilja Rosendahl (born 1968), German film and music producer, actor, songwriter and musician
- Katri Rosendahl (born 1984), Finnish endurance rider
- Ola Rosendahl (1939–2008), Finnish agronomist, farmer and politician
- Pernille Rosendahl (born 1972), Danish singer
- Philip R. Rosendahl (1893–1974), acting governor of the Danish colony of North Greenland from 1925 to 1928
- Saskia Rosendahl (born 1993), German actress
- Sven Rosendahl (1913–1990), Swedish journalist, novelist and short story writer

== See also ==
- Rosendaël, a former commune in the Nord department in northern France
- Roosendaal, a city and a municipality in the province of North Brabant in southern Netherlands
- Rosenthal (disambiguation)
