= Roosendael Abbey =

- Abdij van Rozendaal
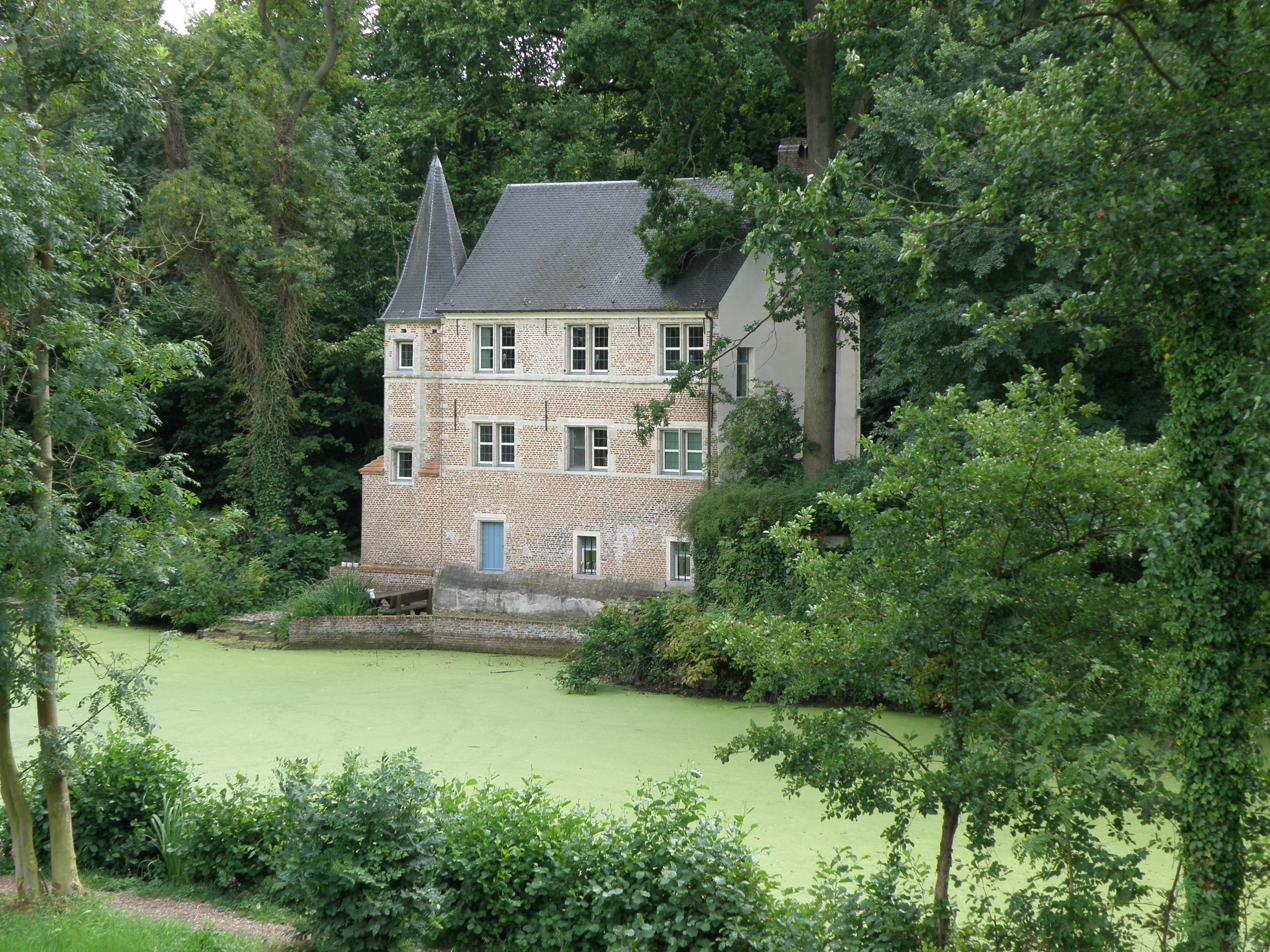
- Interactive map of Roosendael Abbey

Monastery information
- Order: Cistercian nuns
- Established: before 1227
- Disestablished: 1797
- Diocese: Cambrai (to 1559); Antwerp (from 1559)

Architecture
- Functional status: residential youth centre
- Heritage designation: listed built heritage

Site
- Location: Elzestraat, Belgium
- Coordinates: 51.071646°N 4.466942°E

Roosendael Abbey (the abbey of the valley of roses) was a community of Cistercian nuns, founded in the 13th century on the banks of the River Nete in the Duchy of Brabant, at a location now in Elzestraat, in the Sint-Katelijne-Waver municipality. The monastery was established in or before 1227 by the nobleman Gillis Berthout, according to later tradition for his daughters Elizabeth and Oda. An early member of the community who gave it a wider reputation for sanctity was Blessed Ida of Louvain.

The monastery was ordered closed in 1795, during the French occupation of Belgium, and the nuns were forced off the premises in January 1797. The main building became a country house in the 19th century.

In 1828 the archivist of the National Archives of Belgium was notified that a pile of old parchment was available from a second-hand clothes dealer in Brussels. This transpired to be the remains of the monastery's archives, with over a thousand documents, including papal bulls and ducal charters, the oldest going back to 1235.

== Current use ==
The site is now a residential youth centre. The grounds are a park. All that remains of the monastic buildings are a monumental gate, a coach house, an infirmary and an ice cellar.
