= Jack Rosendaal =

Dutch decathlete (born 1973)

Jacobus Cornelius Rosendaal (born September 12, 1973, in Apeldoorn, Gelderland) is a retired Dutch decathlete, who represented his native country at the 1996 Summer Olympics in Atlanta, United States. There he finished in 21st place in the men's decathlon competition, earning a total number of 8.035 points. The other competitor from the Netherlands, Marcel Dost, ended up in 18th position, collecting 8.111 points.

== Achievements ==
Year	Competition	Venue	Position	Notes
Representing Netherlands
1996	Olympic Games	Atlanta, United States	21st	Decathlon
1997	World Championships	Athens, Greece	DNF	Decathlon
1998	European Championships	Budapest, Hungary	11th	Decathlon
1998	IAAF World Combined Events Challenge	several places	13th	Decathlon
2000	Hypo-Meeting	Götzis, Austria	DNF	Decathlon
