= 1997 in the decathlon =

This page lists the World Best Year Performance in the year 1997 in the men's decathlon. One of the main events during this season were the 1997 World Championships in Athens, Greece, where the competition started on August 5, 1997, and ended on August 6, 1997.

== Records ==
Standing records prior to the 1997 season in track and field
World Record	Dan O'Brien (USA)	8891	September 5, 1992	Talence, France

== 1997 World Year Ranking ==
Rank	Points	Athlete	Venue	Date	Note
1	8837	Tomáš Dvořák (CZE)	Athens, Greece	1997-08-06	
2	8730	Eduard Hämäläinen (FIN)	Athens, Greece	1997-08-06	NR
3	8652	Frank Busemann (GER)	Athens, Greece	1997-08-06	
4	8604	Steve Fritz (USA)	Indianapolis, United States	1997-06-13	
5	8555	Michael Smith (CAN)	Götzis, Austria	1997-06-01	
6	8534	Erki Nool (EST)	Götzis, Austria	1997-06-01	
7	8470	Jón Arnar Magnússon (ISL)	Götzis, Austria	1997-06-01	
8	8458	Chris Huffins (USA)	Indianapolis, United States	1997-06-13	
9	8445	Ramil Ganiyev (UZB)	Athens, Greece	1997-08-06	NR
10	8380	Roman Šebrle (CZE)	Catania, Italy	1997-08-20	
11	8360	Stefan Schmid (GER)	Athens, Greece	1997-08-06	
12	8322	Francisco Javier Benet (ESP)	Alhama de Murcia, Spain	1997-06-01	
13	8310	Klaus Isekenmeier (GER)	Alhama de Murcia, Spain	1997-06-01	PB
14	8290	Sebastian Chmara (POL)	Maribor, Slovenia	1997-06-29	
15	8268	Shawn Wilbourn (USA)	Indianapolis, United States	1997-06-13	PB
16	8259	Jagan Hames (AUS)	Adelaide, Australia	1997-03-30	
17	8239	Robert Změlík (CZE)	Alhama de Murcia, Spain	1997-06-01	
18	8228	Kip Janvrin (USA)	Indianapolis, United States	1997-06-13	
19	8211	Michael Kohnle (GER)	Ratingen, Germany	1997-06-01	
20	8184	Lev Lobodin (RUS)	Götzis, Austria	1997-06-01	
21	8182	Antonio Peñalver (ESP)	Alhama de Murcia, Spain	1997-06-01	
22	8173	Kamil Damašek (CZE)	Talence, France	1997-09-14	
23	8140	Indrek Kaseorg (EST)	Athens, Greece	1997-08-06	
24	8128	Jaime Peñas (ESP)	Alhama de Murcia, Spain	1997-06-01	PB
25	8123	Darwin Vandehoef (USA)	Indianapolis, United States	1997-06-13	

== See also ==
- 1997 Hypo-Meeting
