= Athletics at the 1995 Summer Universiade – Men's decathlon =

The men's decathlon event at the 1995 Summer Universiade was held on 1–2 September 1995 at the Hakatanomori Athletic Stadium in Fukuoka, Japan.

== Medalists ==
Gold	Silver	Bronze
Dezső Szabó; Hungary	Sebastian Chmara; Poland	Dmitriy Sukhomazov; Belarus

== Results ==
=== 100 metres ===
Wind:
Heat 1: +1.9 m/s, Heat 2: +2.0 m/s, Heat 3: +0.2 m/s, Heat 4: +0.7 m/s

Rank	Heat	Name	Nationality	Time	Points	Notes
1	1	Jamie Quarry	Great Britain	10.82	901	
2	3	Prodromos Korkizoglou	Greece	10.90	883	
3	1	Phillip Sategna	United States	10.92	878	
4	2	Barry Thomas	Great Britain	10.96	870	
5	2	Tomokazu Sugama	Japan	10.98	865	
6	3	Dezső Szabó	Hungary	11.02	856	
7	4	Dmitriy Sukhomazov	Belarus	11.04	852	
8	1	Aleksandr Bogdanov	Ukraine	11.07	845	
9	2	Valeriy Belousov	Russia	11.08	843	
10	2	Curtis Heywood	Canada	11.10	838	
11	4	Romeo Hurduc	Romania	11.13	832	
12	3	Michael Nolan	Canada	11.16	825	
13	4	Frank Müller	Germany	11.18	821	
14	2	Pierre-Alexandre Vial	France	11.19	819	
15	1	Zsolt Kürtösi	Hungary	11.20	817	
15	3	Cédric Lopez	France	11.20	817	
17	1	Mikko Valle	Finland	11.21	814	
18	1	Bai Bai Conteh	Sierra Leone	11.25	806	
19	4	Pierre Faber	South Africa	11.26	804	
20	4	Beniamino Poserina	Italy	11.26	804	
21	2	Aric Long	United States	11.28	799	
22	1	Indrek Kaseorg	Estonia	11.29	797	
22	2	Brendan Tennant	Australia	11.29	797	
24	4	Mirko Spada	Switzerland	11.30	795	
25	3	Toshio Higuchi	Japan	11.31	793	
26	3	Sebastian Chmara	Poland	11.43	767	
27	4	Francisco Javier Benet	Spain	11.49	755	
	3	Rashid Qureshi	Pakistan	DNS	0	

=== Long jump ===
Rank	Group	Athlete	Nationality	#1	#2	#3	Result	Points	Notes	Total
1	A	Sebastian Chmara	Poland	x	7.41w	7.69	7.69	982		1749
2	A	Prodromos Korkizoglou	Greece	7.46w	x	5.53	7.46w	925		1808
3	A	Cédric Lopez	France	7.16	7.45w	7.11	7.45w	922		1739
4	A	Aleksandr Bogdanov	Ukraine	7.04	x	7.31	7.31	888		1733
5	A	Indrek Kaseorg	Estonia	x	7.09	7.31	7.25	874		1671
6	A	Phillip Sategna	United States	7.22	x	6.98	7.22	866		1744
7	B	Frank Müller	Germany	7.21	x	7.08	7.21	864		1685
8	A	Jamie Quarry	Great Britain	x	7.01	7.18	7.18	857		1758
9	B	Dmitriy Sukhomazov	Belarus	6.99w	x	7.18	7.18	857		1709
10	A	Toshio Higuchi	Japan	x	7.17w	x	7.17w	854		1647
11	B	Zsolt Kürtösi	Hungary	7.16	x	7.12w	7.16	852		1669
12	B	Barry Thomas	Great Britain	7.10	7.01	7.15	7.15	850		1720
13	B	Aric Long	United States	x	7.15w	6.76	7.15w	850		1649
14	A	Romeo Hurduc	Romania	7.14w	6.77w	6.94	7.14w	847		1679
15	B	Valeriy Belousov	Russia	6.80	7.14w	x	7.14w	847		1690
16	A	Dezső Szabó	Hungary	x	x	7.11	7.11	840		1696
17	B	Beniamino Poserina	Italy	7.04	7.09	7.10	7.10	838		1642
18	B	Brendan Tennant	Australia	6.93w	7.05	6.93	7.05	826		1623
19	B	Michael Nolan	Canada	7.03	7.04		7.04	823		1648
20	B	Pierre Faber	South Africa	7.00	6.79	6.40	7.00	814		1618
21	B	Mirko Spada	Switzerland	6.52	6.96	6.44	6.96	804		1599
22	B	Pierre-Alexandre Vial	France	6.52w	6.94w	x	6.94	799		1618
23	B	Tomokazu Sugama	Japan	6.65	x	6.92	6.92	795		1660
24	A	Curtis Heywood	Canada	6.68w	6.78w	6.75	6.78w	762		1600
25	B	Francisco Javier Benet	Spain	6.77	6.60	6.55w	6.77	760		1515
26	A	Bai Bai Conteh	Sierra Leone	5.42	5.54	5.95	5.95	576		1382
	A	Mikko Valle	Finland	x	x	x	NM	0		814

=== Shot put ===
Rank	Group	Athlete	Nationality	#1	#2	#3	Result	Points	Notes	Total
1	B	Aric Long	United States	15.30	16.04	x	16.04	854		2503
2	A	Mirko Spada	Switzerland	14.48	x	15.23	15.23	804		2403
3	B	Sebastian Chmara	Poland	13.87	14.70	x	14.70	771		2520
4	B	Pierre Faber	South Africa	13.66	14.25	x	14.25	744		2362
5	A	Michael Nolan	Canada	x	x	14.21	14.21	741		2389
6	A	Valeriy Belousov	Russia	13.48	14.10	x	14.10	734		2424
7	A	Dmitriy Sukhomazov	Belarus	13.92	13.99	14.00	14.00	728		2437
8	A	Aleksandr Bogdanov	Ukraine	13.18	x	13.98	13.98	727		2460
9	A	Jamie Quarry	Great Britain	13.60	x	13.93	13.93	724		2482
10	B	Zsolt Kürtösi	Hungary	13.73	13.56	13.66	13.73	712		2381
11	A	Indrek Kaseorg	Estonia	11.42	12.79	13.71	13.71	711		2382
12	B	Prodromos Korkizoglou	Greece	12.54	13.25	13.69	13.69	709		2517
13	A	Cédric Lopez	France	x	13.20	13.49	13.49	697		2436
14	A	Frank Müller	Germany	13.45	13.45	13.27	13.45	695		2380
15	A	Phillip Sategna	United States	13.09	13.10	13.41	13.41	692		2436
16	A	Romeo Hurduc	Romania	12.89	13.36	13.21	13.36	689		2368
17	B	Beniamino Poserina	Italy	13.24	12.97	x	13.24	682		2324
18	A	Tomokazu Sugama	Japan	11.22	13.05	13.21	13.21	680		2340
19	B	Brendan Tennant	Australia	x	13.00	13.20	13.20	679		2302
20	B	Barry Thomas	Great Britain	12.72	13.07	12.51	13.07	672		2392
21	A	Dezső Szabó	Hungary	12.68	12.06	x	12.68	648		2344
22	A	Francisco Javier Benet	Spain	12.65	12.13	12.44	12.65	646		2161
23	B	Toshio Higuchi	Japan	12.25	11.73	12.28	12.28	623		2270
24	B	Mikko Valle	Finland	12.00	x	x	12.00	606		1420
25	B	Pierre-Alexandre Vial	France	x	11.91	x	11.91	601		2219
26	B	Bai Bai Conteh	Sierra Leone	9.62	9.18	10.05	10.05	489		1871
27	B	Curtis Heywood	Canada	9.58	9.57	9.57	9.58	460		2060

=== High jump ===
Rank	Group	Athlete	Nationality	1.70	1.73	1.76	1.79	1.82	1.85	1.88	1.91	1.94	1.97	2.00	2.03	2.06	2.09	2.12	2.15	2.18	Result	Points	Notes	Total
1	A	Sebastian Chmara	Poland	–	–	–	–	–	–	o	–	o	–	o	–	o	o	o	o	xx	2.15	944		3464
2	B	Aric Long	United States	–	–	–	–	–	–	–	–	–	–	xo	xxo	o	o	xxx			2.09	887		3390
3	B	Dmitriy Sukhomazov	Belarus	–	–	–	–	–	–	–	–	–	o	–	o	o	xo	xxx			2.09	887		3324
4	B	Zsolt Kürtösi	Hungary	–	–	–	–	o	–	o	–	o	o	o	o	o	xxx				2.06	859		3240
5	A	Dezső Szabó	Hungary	–	–	–	–	–	o	–	o	o	o	o	xxx						2.00	803		3147
5	A	Cédric Lopez	France	–	–	–	o	–	o	–	o	o	o	o	xxx						2.00	803		3239
7	A	Indrek Kaseorg	Estonia	–	–	–	–	–	–	xo	–	o	o	o	xxx						2.00	803		3185
7	A	Romeo Hurduc	Romania	–	–	–	–	o	–	o	o	o	xo	o	xxx						2.00	803		3171
9	B	Valeriy Belousov	Russia	–	–	–	–	–	–	–	o	–	–	xo	–	xxx					2.00	803		3227
10	A	Prodromos Korkizoglou	Greece	–	–	–	–	o	–	o	o	xo	o	xxo	xxx						2.00	803		3320
11	A	Aleksandr Bogdanov	Ukraine	–	–	–	–	–	xo	–	xxo	xo	xxo	xxo	xxx						2.00	803		3263
12	B	Barry Thomas	Great Britain	–	–	–	–	–	o	–	o	o	o	xxx							1.97	776		3168
13	A	Toshio Higuchi	Japan	–	–	–	–	–	–	o	–	o	xo	xxx							1.97	776		3046
13	B	Michael Nolan	Canada	–	–	–	–	–	o	–	o	o	xo	xxx							1.97	776		3165
15	B	Pierre Faber	South Africa	–	o	o	xo	xxo	xxo	o	xxo	xxo	xxo	xxx							1.97	776		3138
16	A	Jamie Quarry	Great Britain	–	–	–	–	o	o	o	o	o	xxx								1.94	749		3231
17	B	Francisco Javier Benet	Spain	–	–	–	–	o	o	o	o	xo	xxx								1.94	749		2910
18	B	Frank Müller	Germany	–	–	–	–	–	–	xo	–	xo	xxx								1.94	749		3129
19	B	Beniamino Poserina	Italy	–	–	–	–	–	o	xo	xo	xxx									1.91	723		3047
20	B	Tomokazu Sugama	Japan	–	–	–	–	o	xo	o	xxx										1.88	696		3036
21	A	Phillip Sategna	United States	–	–	–	–	o	o	xo	xxx										1.88	696		3132
22	B	Mirko Spada	Switzerland	–	–	o	o	o	xo	xo	xxx										1.88	696		3099
23	A	Curtis Heywood	Canada	–	–	–	–	xo	–	xxx											1.82	644		2704
23	B	Brendan Tennant	Australia	–	–	o	o	xo	xxx												1.82	644		2946
	A	Bai Bai Conteh	Sierra Leone	xxx																	NM	0		1871
	B	Pierre-Alexandre Vial	France	–	–	–	xxx														NM	0		2219
	A	Mikko Valle	Finland																		DNS	0		DNF

=== 400 metres ===
Rank	Heat	Name	Nationality	Time	Points	Notes	Total
1	3	Dezső Szabó	Hungary	48.50	885		4032
2	1	Indrek Kaseorg	Estonia	48.66	877		4062
3	3	Sebastian Chmara	Poland	48.84	869		4333
4	4	Tomokazu Sugama	Japan	48.94	864		3900
5	3	Michael Nolan	Canada	49.61	833		3998
6	2	Dmitriy Sukhomazov	Belarus	49.69	829		4153
7	1	Jamie Quarry	Great Britain	49.76	826		4057
8	2	Beniamino Poserina	Italy	49.78	825		3872
9	4	Valeriy Belousov	Russia	49.88	820		4047
10	4	Barry Thomas	Great Britain	49.90	819		3987
11	3	Toshio Higuchi	Japan	50.02	814		3860
12	2	Frank Müller	Germany	50.08	811		3940
13	3	Cédric Lopez	France	50.15	808		4047
14	2	Mirko Spada	Switzerland	50.46	794		3893
15	3	Prodromos Korkizoglou	Greece	50.81	778		4098
16	1	Zsolt Kürtösi	Hungary	50.85	776		4016
17	1	Phillip Sategna	United States	50.91	773		3905
18	2	Romeo Hurduc	Romania	50.94	772		3943
19	1	Bai Bai Conteh	Sierra Leone	50.96	771		2642
20	4	Aric Long	United States	51.30	756		4146
21	1	Aleksandr Bogdanov	Ukraine	51.33	754		4017
22	2	Francisco Javier Benet	Spain	51.48	748		3658
23	4	Brendan Tennant	Australia	51.60	742		3688
24	2	Pierre Faber	South Africa	52.32	711		3849
25	4	Curtis Heywood	Canada	52.38	708		3412
	4	Pierre-Alexandre Vial	France	DNS	0		DNF

=== 110 metres hurdles ===
Wind:
Heat 1: -1.7 m/s, Heat 2: +0.5 m/s, Heat 3: -0.6 m/s, Heat 4: +0.2 m/s

Rank	Lane	Name	Nationality	Time	Points	Notes	Total
1	2	Dezső Szabó	Hungary	14.56	903		4935
2	1	Valeriy Belousov	Russia	14.59	900		4947
3	4	Indrek Kaseorg	Estonia	14.61	897		4959
4	4	Jamie Quarry	Great Britain	14.64	894		4951
5	3	Dmitriy Sukhomazov	Belarus	14.67	890		5043
6	3	Mirko Spada	Switzerland	14.68	889		4782
7	2	Sebastian Chmara	Poland	14.84	869		5202
8	2	Prodromos Korkizoglou	Greece	14.88	864		4962
9	4	Zsolt Kürtösi	Hungary	14.89	863		4879
10	3	Beniamino Poserina	Italy	14.91	860		4732
11	1	Aric Long	United States	15.06	842		4988
12	1	Barry Thomas	Great Britain	15.15	831		4818
13	3	Frank Müller	Germany	15.20	825		4765
14	2	Cédric Lopez	France	15.32	811		4858
15	2	Toshio Higuchi	Japan	15.48	792		4652
16	4	Phillip Sategna	United States	15.56	783		4688
17	3	Francisco Javier Benet	Spain	15.68	769		4427
18	1	Brendan Tennant	Australia	15.91	743		4431
19	1	Curtis Heywood	Canada	15.94	740		4152
20	1	Tomokazu Sugama	Japan	16.17	714		4614
21	2	Michael Nolan	Canada	16.31	698		4696
21	4	Bai Bai Conteh	Sierra Leone	16.31	698		3340
23	3	Pierre Faber	South Africa	16.98	626		4475
24	3	Romeo Hurduc	Romania	17.37	586		4529
	4	Aleksandr Bogdanov	Ukraine	DNS	0		DNF

=== Discus throw ===
Rank	Group	Athlete	Nationality	#1	#2	#3	Result	Points	Notes	Total
1	B	Aric Long	United States	47.42	48.66	47.42	48.66	843		5831
2	A	Pierre Faber	South Africa	43.62	x	45.28	45.28	773		5248
3	A	Zsolt Kürtösi	Hungary	x	41.68	43.90	43.90	744		5623
4	B	Mirko Spada	Switzerland	43.30	42.60	x	43.30	732		5514
5	B	Brendan Tennant	Australia	38.08	42.72	41.78	42.72	720		5151
6	B	Frank Müller	Germany	x	36.06	42.58	42.58	717		5482
7	B	Indrek Kaseorg	Estonia	40.66	40.38	41.74	41.74	700		5659
8	B	Francisco Javier Benet	Spain	41.08	41.30	41.54	41.54	696		5123
9	B	Tomokazu Sugama	Japan	40.02	x	41.10	41.10	687		5301
10	B	Jamie Quarry	Great Britain	37.56	41.02	x	41.02	685		5636
11	A	Valeriy Belousov	Russia	39.80	40.60	40.40	40.60	677		5624
12	A	Phillip Sategna	United States	40.58	x	x	40.58	676		5364
13	A	Barry Thomas	Great Britain	39.26	40.54	39.18	40.54	676		5494
14	B	Sebastian Chmara	Poland	37.00	39.22	40.10	40.10	667		5869
15	B	Cédric Lopez	France	38.82	39.98	39.82	39.98	664		5522
16	A	Beniamino Poserina	Italy	36.16	39.64	x	39.64	657		5389
17	A	Dmitriy Sukhomazov	Belarus	37.46	39.62	x	39.62	657		5700
18	B	Dezső Szabó	Hungary	39.44	37.88	38.60	39.44	653		5588
19	A	Prodromos Korkizoglou	Greece	38.40	39.12	x	39.12	647		5609
20	A	Romeo Hurduc	Romania	38.18	36.78	x	38.18	628		5157
21	A	Toshio Higuchi	Japan	34.64	33.56	35.28	35.28	569		5221
22	B	Curtis Heywood	Canada	31.18	29.98	31.42	31.42	492		4644
	A	Michael Nolan	Canada				DNS	0		DNF
	B	Bai Bai Conteh	Sierra Leone				DNS	0		DNF

=== Pole vault ===
Rank	Group	Athlete	Nationality	3.80	4.00	4.20	4.30	4.40	4.50	4.60	4.70	4.80	4.90	5.00	5.20	5.30	Result	Points	Notes	Total
1	B	Dezső Szabó	Hungary	–	–	–	–	–	–	o	–	o	–	xxo	o	xxx	5.20	972		6560
2	B	Phillip Sategna	United States	–	–	–	–	–	–	–	–	o	–	o	xxo	xxx	5.20	972		6336
3	A	Curtis Heywood	Canada	–	–	–	–	–	–	–	–	o	–	xxx			4.80	849		5493
3	B	Zsolt Kürtösi	Hungary	–	–	o	–	o	–	o	o	o	xxx				4.80	849		6472
5	A	Dmitriy Sukhomazov	Belarus	–	–	–	–	–	o	–	xo	o	xxx				4.80	849		6549
6	A	Tomokazu Sugama	Japan	–	–	–	–	–	–	o	–	xo	–	xxx			4.80	849		6150
6	A	Valeriy Belousov	Russia	–	–	–	–	o	–	o	–	xo	xxx				4.80	849		6473
8	A	Barry Thomas	Great Britain	–	–	–	–	xo	–	xxo	–	xo	xxx				4.80	849		6343
9	A	Aric Long	United States	–	–	–	–	–	–	–	o	xxo	xxx				4.80	849		6680
10	B	Sebastian Chmara	Poland	–	–	–	–	o	–	o	o	xxx					4.70	819		6688
11	A	Frank Müller	Germany	–	–	–	–	o	–	–	xo	–	xxx				4.70	819		6301
12	B	Prodromos Korkizoglou	Greece	–	o	–	o	–	o	xx–	–	x					4.50	760		6369
12	B	Indrek Kaseorg	Estonia	–	o	o	–	o	o	xxx							4.50	760		6419
14	B	Cédric Lopez	France	o	o	o	–	o	xo	xxx							4.50	760		6282
15	A	Mirko Spada	Switzerland	–	–	o	–	o	–	xxx							4.40	731		6245
16	A	Francisco Javier Benet	Spain	–	–	–	–	xo	–	xxx							4.40	731		5854
17	A	Romeo Hurduc	Romania	–	o	o	–	xxo	xxx								4.40	731		5888
18	A	Brendan Tennant	Australia	–	o	o	o	xxo	xxx								4.40	731		5882
19	B	Toshio Higuchi	Japan	–	xo	o	–	xxx									4.20	673		5894
20	A	Pierre Faber	South Africa	–	o	–	–	x									4.00	617		5865
20	A	Beniamino Poserina	Italy	–	o	–	xxx										4.00	617		6006
22	B	Jamie Quarry	Great Britain	o	xxx												3.80	562		6198

=== Javelin throw ===
Rank	Group	Athlete	Nationality	#1	#2	#3	Result	Points	Notes	Total
1	A	Cédric Lopez	France	64.18	66.06	60.20	66.06	829		7111
2	B	Frank Müller	Germany	58.66	x	64.54	64.54	806		7107
3	B	Tomokazu Sugama	Japan	62.24	62.56	59.30	62.56	776		6926
4	B	Dmitriy Sukhomazov	Belarus	58.38	x	61.22	61.22	756		7305
5	A	Toshio Higuchi	Japan	56.76	60.36	58.54	60.36	743		6637
6	B	Barry Thomas	Great Britain	55.68	x	60.30	60.30	742		7085
7	B	Phillip Sategna	United States	60.04	56.28	52.40	60.04	738		7074
8	A	Indrek Kaseorg	Estonia	59.62	x	55.66	59.62	732		7151
9	A	Brendan Tennant	Australia	49.62	59.46	59.58	59.58	732		6614
10	A	Romeo Hurduc	Romania	54.84	55.24	59.58	59.58	732		6620
11	B	Valeriy Belousov	Russia	54.20	59.14	x	59.14	725		7198
12	B	Zsolt Kürtösi	Hungary	55.76	56.80	57.86	57.86	706		7178
13	B	Dezső Szabó	Hungary	50.58	57.04	53.42	57.04	693		7253
14	B	Aric Long	United States	53.16	55.38	56.74	56.74	689		7369
15	A	Mirko Spada	Switzerland	55.12	56.38	55.86	56.38	684		6929
16	A	Beniamino Poserina	Italy	52.78	x	52.06	52.78	630		6636
17	A	Francisco Javier Benet	Spain	x	x	50.88	50.88	602		6456
18	B	Sebastian Chmara	Poland	49.86	50.76	49.02	50.76	600		7288
19	A	Prodromos Korkizoglou	Greece	41.48	49.04	49.04	49.04	574		6943
20	A	Jamie Quarry	Great Britain	47.68	x	x	47.68	554		6752
21	B	Curtis Heywood	Canada	43.34	44.46	44.30	44.46	507		6000
	B	Pierre Faber	South Africa				DNS	0		DNF

=== 1500 metres ===
Rank	Heat	Name	Nationality	Time	Points	Notes
1	2	Dezső Szabó	Hungary	4:21.96	798	
2	2	Indrek Kaseorg	Estonia	4:22.93	792	
3	2	Valeriy Belousov	Russia	4:32.29	730	
4	2	Sebastian Chmara	Poland	4:32.79	726	
5	1	Romeo Hurduc	Romania	4:37.48	696	
6	2	Cédric Lopez	France	4:37.64	695	
7	2	Barry Thomas	Great Britain	4:39.93	681	
8	1	Brendan Tennant	Australia	4:40.22	679	
9	2	Dmitriy Sukhomazov	Belarus	4:42.34	666	
10	1	Beniamino Poserina	Italy	4:43.98	655	
11	1	Jamie Quarry	Great Britain	4:45.00	649	
12	2	Zsolt Kürtösi	Hungary	4:45.05	649	
13	1	Mirko Spada	Switzerland	4:45.83	644	
14	2	Frank Müller	Germany	4:51.64	609	
15	2	Aric Long	United States	4:52.95	601	
16	1	Toshio Higuchi	Japan	4:53.03	601	
17	1	Phillip Sategna	United States	4:54.77	590	
18	1	Prodromos Korkizoglou	Greece	4:56.82	578	
19	1	Curtis Heywood	Canada	4:57.14	576	
20	1	Tomokazu Sugama	Japan	4:58.36	569	
	1	Francisco Javier Benet	Spain	DNS	0	

=== Final standings ===
The highest mark recorded in each event is highlighted in yellow

Rank	Athlete	Nationality	100m	LJ	SP	HJ	400m	110m H	DT	PV	JT	1500m	Points	Notes
1st place, gold medalist(s)	Dezső Szabó	Hungary	11.02	7.11	12.68	2.00	48.50	14.56	39.44	5.20	57.04	4:21.96	8051	
2nd place, silver medalist(s)	Sebastian Chmara	Poland	11.43	7.69	14.70	2.15	48.84	14.84	40.10	4.70	50.76	4:32.79	8014	
3rd place, bronze medalist(s)	Dmitriy Sukhomazov	Belarus	11.04	7.18	14.00	2.09	49.69	14.67	39.62	4.80	61.22	4:42.34	7971	
4	Aric Long	United States	11.28	7.15	16.04	2.09	51.30	15.06	48.66	4.80	56.74	4:52.95	7970	
5	Indrek Kaseorg	Estonia	11.29	7.25	13.71	2.00	48.66	14.61	41.74	4.50	59.62	4:22.93	7943	
6	Valeriy Belousov	Russia	11.08	7.14	14.10	2.00	49.88	14.59	40.60	4.80	59.14	4:32.29	7928	
7	Zsolt Kürtösi	Hungary	11.20	7.16	13.73	2.06	50.85	14.89	43.90	4.80	57.86	4:45.05	7827	
8	Cédric Lopez	France	11.20	7.45	13.49	2.00	50.15	15.32	39.98	4.50	66.06	4:37.64	7806	
9	Barry Thomas	Great Britain	10.96	7.15	13.07	1.97	49.90	15.15	40.54	4.80	60.30	4:39.93	7766	
10	Frank Müller	Germany	11.18	7.21	13.45	1.94	50.08	15.20	42.58	4.70	64.54	4:51.64	7716	
11	Phillip Sategna	United States	10.92	7.22	13.41	1.88	50.91	15.56	40.58	5.20	60.04	4:54.77	7664	
12	Mirko Spada	Switzerland	11.30	6.96	15.23	1.88	50.46	14.68	43.30	4.40	56.38	4:45.83	7573	
13	Prodromos Korkizoglou	Greece	10.90	7.46	13.69	2.00	50.81	14.88	39.12	4.50	49.04	4:56.82	7521	
14	Tomokazu Sugama	Japan	10.98	6.92	13.21	1.88	48.94	16.17	41.10	4.80	62.56	4:58.36	7495	
15	Jamie Quarry	Great Britain	10.82	7.18	13.93	1.94	49.76	14.64	41.02	3.80	47.68	4:45.00	7401	
16	Romeo Hurduc	Romania	11.13	7.14	13.36	2.00	50.94	17.37	38.18	4.40	59.58	4:37.48	7316	
17	Brendan Tennant	Australia	11.29	7.05	13.20	1.82	51.60	15.91	42.72	4.40	59.58	4:40.22	7293	
18	Beniamino Poserina	Italy	11.26	7.10	13.24	1.91	49.78	14.91	39.64	4.00	52.78	4:43.98	7291	
19	Toshio Higuchi	Japan	11.31	7.17	12.28	1.97	50.02	15.48	35.28	4.20	60.36	4:53.03	7238	
20	Curtis Heywood	Canada	11.10	6.78	9.58	1.82	52.38	15.94	31.42	4.80	44.46	4:57.14	6576	
	Francisco Javier Benet	Spain	11.49	6.77	12.65	1.94	51.48	15.68	41.54	4.40	50.88	DNS	DNF	
	Pierre Faber	South Africa	11.26	7.00	14.25	1.97	52.32	16.98	45.28	4.00	DNS	–	DNF	
	Michael Nolan	Canada	11.16	7.04	14.21	1.97	49.61	16.31	DNS	–	–	–	DNF	
	Bai Bai Conteh	Sierra Leone	11.25	5.95	10.05	NM	50.96	16.31	DNS	–	–	–	DNF	
	Aleksandr Bogdanov	Ukraine	11.07	7.31	13.98	2.00	51.33	DNS	–	–	–	–	DNF	
	Pierre-Alexandre Vial	France	11.19	6.94	11.91	NM	DNS	–	–	–	–	–	DNF	
	Mikko Valle	Finland	11.21	NM	12.00	DNS	–	–	–	–	–	–	DNF	
	Rashid Qureshi	Pakistan	DNS	–	–	–	–	–	–	–	–	–	DNS	
