= 2000 in the decathlon =

This page lists the World Best Year Performance in the year 2000 in the men's decathlon. The main event during this season were the 2000 Summer Olympics in Sydney, Australia, where the competition started on Wednesday September 27, 2000 and ended on Thursday September 28, 2000.

== Records ==
Standing records prior to the 2000 season in track and field
World Record	Tomáš Dvořák (CZE)	8994	July 4, 1999	Prague, Czech Republic

== 2000 World Year Ranking ==
Rank	Points	Athlete	Venue	Date	Note
1	8900	Tomáš Dvořák (CZE)	Götzis, Austria	04/06/2000	
2	8757	Roman Šebrle (CZE)	Götzis, Austria	04/06/2000	
3	8742	Erki Nool (EST)	Götzis, Austria	04/06/2000	
4	8595	Chris Huffins (USA)	Sydney, Australia	28/09/2000	
5	8574	Oleksandr Yurkov (UKR)	Götzis, Austria	04/06/2000	PB
6	8567	Dean Macey (GBR)	Sydney, Australia	28/09/2000	
7	8554	Attila Zsivoczky (HUN)	Götzis, Austria	04/06/2000	
8	8531	Frank Busemann (GER)	Götzis, Austria	04/06/2000	
9	8485	Stefan Schmid (GER)	Ratingen, Germany	23/07/2000	
10	8467	Tom Pappas (USA)	Sacramento, United States	21/07/2000	
11	8461	Mike Maczey (GER)	Götzis, Austria	04/06/2000	PB
12	8339	Jiří Ryba (CZE)	Desenzano del Garda, Italy	14/05/2000	PB
13	8314	Jan Podìbradský (CZE)	Arles, France	04/06/2000	
14	8253	Wilfrid Boulineau (FRA)	Arles, France	04/06/2000	
15	8252	Raúl Duany (CUB)	Havana, Cuba	24/07/2000	
16	8224	Eduard Hämäläinen (FIN)	Lahti, Finland	20/08/2000	
17	8209	Roman Razbeyko (RUS)	Novosibirsk, Russia	20/08/2000	
18	8206	Jón Arnar Magnússon (ISL)	Götzis, Austria	04/06/2000	
19	8188	Aki Heikkinen (FIN)	Lahti, Finland	20/08/2000	PB
20	8178	Laurent Hernu (FRA)	Talence, France	30/07/2000	
21	8178	Henrik Dagård (SWE)	Sydney, Australia	28/09/2000	
22	8153	Philipp Huber (SUI)	Götzis, Austria	04/06/2000	PB
23	8149	Zsolt Kürtösi (HUN)	Sydney, Australia	28/09/2000	PB
24	8136	Mário Aníbal (POR)	Sydney, Australia	28/09/2000	NR
25	8127	Florian Schönbeck (GER)	Wesel, Germany	03/09/2000	PB

== See also ==
- 2000 Hypo-Meeting
