= 1994 in the decathlon =

This page lists the World Best Year Performance in the year 1994 in the men's decathlon. One of the main events during this season were the 1994 European Championships in Helsinki, Finland, where the competition started on August 12, 1994, and ended on August 13, 1994.

== Records ==
Standing records prior to the 1994 season in track and field
World Record	Dan O'Brien (USA)	8891	September 5, 1992	Talence, France

== 1994 World Year Ranking ==
Rank	Points	Athlete	Venue	Date	Note
1	8735	Eduard Hämäläinen (BLR)	Götzis, Austria	1994-05-29	NR
2	8715	Dan O'Brien (USA)	Saint Petersburg, Russia	1994-07-29	
3	8548	Steve Fritz (USA)	Knoxville, United States	1994-06-15	
4	8505	Christian Plaziat (FRA)	Lyon, France	1994-07-03	
5	8453	Alain Blondel (FRA)	Helsinki, Finland	1994-08-13	PB
6	8403	Henrik Dagård (SWE)	Talence, France	1994-09-11	NR
7	8326	Michael Smith (CAN)	Victoria, Canada	1994-08-24	
8	8313	Tomáš Dvořák (CZE)	Lyon, France	1994-07-03	
9	8309	Stefan Schmid (GER)	Talence, France	1994-09-11	
10	8287	Kip Janvrin (USA)	Knoxville, United States	1994-06-14	
11	8281	Sheldon Blockburger (USA)	Knoxville, United States	1994-06-15	
12	8257	Vitaliy Kolpakov (UKR)	Brixen, Italy	1994-07-03	
13	8234	Paul Foxson (USA)	Sacramento, United States	1994-04-16	PB
14	8224	William Motti (FRA)	Talence, France	1994-09-11	
15	8219	Dave Johnson (USA)	Azusa, United States	1994-04-14	
16	8201	Lev Lobodin (RUS)	Helsinki, Finland	1994-08-13	
17	8160	Antonio Peñalver (ESP)	Alhama de Murcia, Spain	1994-06-05	
18	8112	Thorsten Dauth (GER)	Aachen, Germany	1994-07-10	
19	8106	Ramil Ganiyev (UZB)	Vienna, Austria	1994-06-26	
20	8105	Sébastien Levicq (FRA)	Götzis, Austria	1994-05-29	
21	8105	Andrew Fucci (USA)	Knoxville, United States	1994-06-15	
22	8105	Igor Matsanov (BLR)	Gomel, Belarus	1994-08-24	PB
23	8093	Eugenio Balanqué (CUB)	Havana, Cuba	1994-06-24	
24	8093	Erki Nool (EST)	Tallinn, Estonia	1994-07-03	
25	8078	Alex Kruger (GBR)	Götzis, Austria	1994-05-29	

== See also ==
- 1994 Hypo-Meeting
- 1994 Décastar
