= Athletics at the 1996 Summer Olympics – Men's decathlon =

Men's decathlon at the Games of the XXVI Olympiad
- Pictogram of athletics
- Venues: Centennial Olympic Stadium
- Dates: July 31-August 1
- Competitors: 40 from 25 nations
- Winning result: 8824

Medalists
1st place, gold medalist(s)		Dan O'Brien; United States
2nd place, silver medalist(s)		Frank Busemann; Germany
3rd place, bronze medalist(s)		Tomáš Dvořák; Czech Republic

These are the official results of the men's decathlon at the 1996 Summer Olympics in Atlanta, Georgia.

== Medalists ==
Gold	Dan O'Brien; United States
Silver	Frank Busemann; Germany
Bronze	Tomáš Dvořák; Czech Republic

== Schedule ==
July 31
1. 100 m
2. Long Jump
3. Shot Put
4. High Jump
5. 400 m

August 1
6. 110 m hurdles
7. Discus Throw
8. Pole Vault
9. Javelin Throw
10. 1,500 m

== Records ==
Standing records prior to the 1996 Summer Olympics
World Record	Dan O'Brien (USA)	8891	September 5, 1992	Talence, France
Olympic Record	Daley Thompson (GBR)	8847	August 9, 1984	Los Angeles, United States

== Results ==
The highest mark recorded in each event is highlighted in yellow. Since three men cleared 5.40 metres in the pole vault, these marks were split between eleven competitors with the gold medallist claiming the high jump mark.

Rank	Athlete	Decathlon										Points
Rank	Athlete	1	2	3	4	5	6	7	8	9	10	Points
1st place, gold medalist(s)	Dan O'Brien (USA)	10.50	7.57	15.66	2.07	46.82	13.87	48.78	5.00	66.90	4:45.89	8824
2nd place, silver medalist(s)	Frank Busemann (GER)	10.60	8.07	13.60	2.04	48.34	13.47	45.04	4.80	66.86	4:31.41	8706
3rd place, bronze medalist(s)	Tomáš Dvořák (CZE)	10.64	7.60	15.82	1.98	48.29	13.79	46.28	4.70	70.16	4:31.25	8664
4	Steve Fritz (USA)	10.90	7.77	15.31	2.04	50.13	13.97	49.84	5.10	65.70	4:38.26	8644
5	Eduard Hämäläinen (BLR)	10.85	7.48	16.32	1.98	46.91	13.95	49.62	5.00	57.66	4:34.68	8613
6	Erki Nool (EST)	10.65	7.88	14.01	2.01	47.26	15.03	42.98	5.40	65.48	4:43.36	8543
7	Robert Změlík (CZE)	10.83	7.64	13.53	1.95	49.55	14.17	43.44	5.40	67.20	4:38.45	8422
8	Ramil Ganiyev (UZB)	10.84	7.61	14.71	2.13	49.14	14.88	44.86	5.20	53.70	4:42.74	8318
9	Antonio Peñalver (ESP)	10.95	7.27	16.91	2.07	50.41	14.35	48.92	4.70	57.08	4:37.71	8307
10	Chris Huffins (USA)	10.47	7.49	15.57	2.04	48.83	14.10	48.72	4.70	60.62	5:14.36	8300
11	Christian Plaziat (FRA)	10.85	7.82	14.85	2.04	49.07	14.52	45.34	4.90	52.18	4:35.00	8282
12	Jón Arnar Magnússon (ISL)	10.67	7.28	15.52	1.95	47.17	14.22	43.78	4.80	61.10	4:46.97	8274
13	Michael Smith (CAN)	11.08	7.47	16.97	1.95	51.97	14.78	49.54	5.00	64.34	4:43.81	8271
14	Frank Müller (GER)	10.95	7.25	14.69	1.95	49.05	14.86	45.90	5.10	66.10	4:37.50	8253
15	Sebastian Chmara (POL)	11.28	7.75	14.51	2.10	48.75	14.59	42.60	4.90	54.84	4:26.96	8249
16	Kamil Damašek (CZE)	10.86	7.22	15.51	2.01	47.35	14.94	42.66	4.90	55.84	4:26.86	8229
17	Sébastien Levicq (FRA)	11.17	7.16	14.05	1.92	50.55	14.50	45.00	5.40	64.42	4:29.50	8192
18	Marcel Dost (NED)	10.87	7.21	13.91	1.95	48.19	14.52	41.92	5.20	57.76	4:38.81	8111
19	Francisco Javier Benet (ESP)	10.95	7.30	13.91	1.98	48.67	14.36	44.30	4.80	59.44	4:36.04	8107
20	Dirk-Achim Pajonk (GER)	10.67	7.50	14.46	1.95	48.81	14.79	41.94	4.50	54.16	4:21.62	8045
21	Jack Rosendaal (NED)	11.24	7.33	13.59	2.07	50.93	14.46	41.24	4.70	63.80	4:25.98	8035
22	Vitaliy Kolpakov (UKR)	11.15	7.53	14.33	2.07	48.12	14.30	45.66	4.80	53.58	5:05.41	8025
23	Rojs Piziks (LAT)	11.40	6.86	14.60	2.16	51.48	15.20	45.90	5.00	58.40	4:30.88	7994
24	Doug Pirini (NZL)	10.89	7.33	14.75	1.89	48.56	14.88	45.34	4.60	58.02	4:39.09	7961
25	Eugenio Balanque (CUB)	10.71	6.36	14.11	1.89	47.46	14.07	41.64	4.70	59.92	4:38.97	7873
26	Raúl Duany (CUB)	11.20	7.30	13.78	2.07	50.50	14.84	38.56	4.40	62.86	4:35.59	7802
27	Zsolt Kürtösi (HUN)	11.09	7.05	14.29	2.01	50.43	14.64	43.22	4.60	54.80	4:43.21	7755
28	Philipp Huber (SUI)	11.06	7.15	13.34	1.86	48.72	15.08	43.42	4.60	51.96	4:18.15	7743
29	Alper Kasapoglu (TUR)	11.07	7.22	12.89	1.92	49.61	14.55	40.64	4.80	45.24	4:38.69	7575
30	Beniamino Poserina (ITA)	11.05	6.89	—	1.98	49.52	14.68	43.42	4.80	56.78	4:58.28	7013
31	Nikolay Afanasyev (RUS)	11.44	6.74	13.38	1.98	50.83	14.79	43.08	—	55.12	4:41.00	6711
—	Indrek Kaseorg (EST)	11.40	7.26	13.11	2.07	49.03	14.53	39.46	—	—	—	DNF
—	Lev Lobodin (UKR)	10.85	7.35	15.57	1.95	48.96	—	—	—	—	—	DNF
—	Oleg Veretelnikov (UZB)	11.06	7.24	12.66	1.95	49.65	—	—	—	—	—	DNF
—	Scott Ferrier (AUS)	11.26	6.61	12.57	—	—	—	—	—	—	—	DNF
—	Victor Houston (BAR)	10.76	7.53	11.97	—	—	—	—	—	—	—	DNF
—	Peter Winter (AUS)	10.85	—	13.43	—	—	—	—	—	—	—	DNF
—	Alex Kruger (GBR)	11.38	6.55	—	—	—	—	—	—	—	—	DNF
—	Andrei Nazarov (EST)	11.04	—	—	—	—	—	—	—	—	—	DNF
—	Dezső Szabó (HUN)	10.94	—	—	—	—	—	—	—	—	—	DNF

== See also ==
- 1995 Men's World Championships Decathlon
- 1996 Hypo-Meeting
- 1996 Decathlon Year Ranking
- 1997 Men's World Championships Decathlon
