= 1997 IAAF World Indoor Championships – Men's heptathlon =

The men's heptathlon event at the 1997 IAAF World Indoor Championships was held on March 8–9.

== Medalists ==
Gold	Silver	Bronze
Robert Změlík; Czech Republic	Erki Nool; Estonia	Jón Arnar Magnússon; Iceland

== Results ==
=== 60 metres ===
Rank	Heat	Name	Nationality	Time	Points	Notes
1	1	Chris Huffins	United States	6.61	1026	
2	1	Jón Arnar Magnússon	Iceland	6.85	936	
3	2	Erki Nool	Estonia	6.86	933	
4	2	Tomáš Dvořák	Czech Republic	6.99	886	
5	1	Robert Změlík	Czech Republic	7.00	882	
6	2	Christian Plaziat	France	7.11	844	
7	2	Steve Fritz	United States	7.15	830	
8	1	Francisco Javier Benet	Spain	7.21	809	
9	1	Sébastien Levicq	France	7.25	796	
10	2	Sebastian Chmara	Poland	7.34	765	
	1	Michael Kohnle	Germany	DNS	0	
	2	Dirk-Achim Pajonk	Germany	DNS	0	

=== Long jump ===
Rank	Athlete	Nationality	#1	#2	#3	Result	Points	Notes	Total
1	Tomáš Dvořák	Czech Republic	7.47	–	7.69	7.69	982		1868
2	Christian Plaziat	France	–	–	7.58	7.58	955		1799
3	Jón Arnar Magnússon	Iceland	7.52	7.56	–	7.56	950		1886
4	Robert Změlík	Czech Republic	7.36	7.53	–	7.53	942		1824
5	Erki Nool	Estonia	7.44	–	–	7.44	920		1853
6	Steve Fritz	United States	7.17	7.25	7.29	7.29	883		1713
7	Chris Huffins	United States	–	–	7.18	7.18	857		1883
8	Sebastian Chmara	Poland	7.02	7.01	7.11	7.11	840		1605
9	Sébastien Levicq	France	6.65	7.07	7.06	7.07	830		1626
	Francisco Javier Benet	Spain	–	–	–	NM	0		809

=== Shot put ===
Rank	Athlete	Nationality	#1	#2	#3	Result	Points	Notes	Total
1	Jón Arnar Magnússon	Iceland	–	16.05	16.27	16.27	868		2754
2	Tomáš Dvořák	Czech Republic	16.25	15.96	–	16.25	867		2735
3	Chris Huffins	United States	15.42	15.55	–	15.55	824		2707
4	Steve Fritz	United States	14.93	–	14.58	14.93	785		2498
5	Erki Nool	Estonia	14.22	13.43	14.70	14.70	771		2624
6	Robert Změlík	Czech Republic	14.39	14.51	–	14.51	760		2584
7	Sebastian Chmara	Poland	13.78	13.39	14.17	14.17	739		2344
8	Christian Plaziat	France	–	14.04	14.10	14.10	734		2533
9	Sébastien Levicq	France	13.12	13.07	13.64	13.64	706		2332
10	Francisco Javier Benet	Spain	12.99	13.30	–	13.30	686		1495

=== High jump ===
Rank	Athlete	Nationality	1.77	1.83	1.86	1.89	1.92	1.95	1.98	2.01	2.04	2.07	2.10	2.13	Result	Points	Notes	Total
1	Sebastian Chmara	Poland	–	–	–	–	o	o	o	o	o	o	xo	xxx	2.10	896		3240
2	Christian Plaziat	France	–	–	–	o	–	o	–	o	o	xxx			2.04	840		3373
3	Chris Huffins	United States	–	–	–	o	–	o	–	o	xo	xxx			2.04	840		3547
4	Jón Arnar Magnússon	Iceland	–	–	–	o	–	o	o	xo	xo	xxx			2.04	840		3594
5	Steve Fritz	United States	–	–	–	–	o	–	o	xxo	xxx				2.01	813		3311
5	Robert Změlík	Czech Republic	–	–	–	o	–	o	o	xxo	xxx				2.01	813		3397
7	Erki Nool	Estonia	–	–	o	o	o	xxo	xxx						1.95	758		3382
8	Sébastien Levicq	France	–	–	o	o	o	xxx							1.92	731		3063
9	Tomáš Dvořák	Czech Republic	o	o	–	o	xxo	xxx							1.92	731		3466
	Francisco Javier Benet	Spain													DNS	0		DNF

=== 60 metres hurdles ===
Rank	Heat	Name	Nationality	Time	Points	Notes	Total
1	2	Chris Huffins	United States	7.80	1033		4580
2	1	Tomáš Dvořák	Czech Republic	7.87	1015		4481
3	2	Robert Změlík	Czech Republic	7.88	1012		4409
4	2	Christian Plaziat	France	7.89	1010		4383
5	2	Steve Fritz	United States	7.97	989		4300
6	1	Jón Arnar Magnússon	Iceland	8.02	977		4571
7	1	Erki Nool	Estonia	8.08	962		4344
8	1	Sébastien Levicq	France	8.15	944		4007
	1	Sebastian Chmara	Poland	DNS	0		DNF

=== Pole vault ===
Rank	Athlete	Nationality	4.40	4.60	4.70	4.80	4.90	5.00	5.10	5.20	5.30	5.40	5.50	Result	Points	Notes	Total
1	Sébastien Levicq	France	–	o	–	–	o	–	o	–	o	o	xxx	5.40	1035		5042
2	Erki Nool	Estonia	–	–	–	–	–	o	–	o	xxo	xxx		5.30	1004		5348
3	Robert Změlík	Czech Republic	–	–	–	o	–	o	o	xo	xxx			5.20	972		5381
4	Steve Fritz	United States	–	o	–	xo	xxo	o	xxx					5.00	910		5210
5	Christian Plaziat	France	–	o	–	o	xxo	xxx						4.90	880		5263
6	Chris Huffins	United States	o	o	xo	xxx								4.70	819		5399
7	Jón Arnar Magnússon	Iceland	xo	o	xxx									4.60	790		5361
	Tomáš Dvořák	Czech Republic												DNS	0		DNF

=== 1000 metres ===
Rank	Name	Nationality	Time	Points	Notes
1	Erki Nool	Estonia	2:40.75	865	
2	Robert Změlík	Czech Republic	2:42.41	847	
3	Christian Plaziat	France	2:42.75	843	
4	Sébastien Levicq	France	2:44.56	823	
5	Steve Fritz	United States	2:46.97	798	
6	Jón Arnar Magnússon	Iceland	2:48.24	784	
7	Chris Huffins	United States	2:53.53	729	

=== Final standings ===
The highest mark recorded in each event is highlighted in yellow

Rank	Athlete	Nationality	60m	LJ	SP	HJ	60m H	PV	1000m	Points	Notes
1st place, gold medalist(s)	Robert Změlík	Czech Republic	7.00	7.53	14.51	2.01	7.88	5.20	2:42.41	6228	NR
2nd place, silver medalist(s)	Erki Nool	Estonia	6.86	7.44	14.70	1.95	8.08	5.30	2:40.75	6213	PB
3rd place, bronze medalist(s)	Jón Arnar Magnússon	Iceland	6.85	7.56	16.27	2.04	8.02	4.60	2:48.24	6145	NR
4	Chris Huffins	United States	6.61	7.18	15.55	2.04	7.80	4.70	2:53.53	6128	
5	Christian Plaziat	France	7.11	7.58	14.10	2.04	7.89	4.90	2:42.75	6106	SB
6	Steve Fritz	United States	7.15	7.29	14.93	2.01	7.97	5.00	2:46.97	6008	
7	Sébastien Levicq	France	7.25	7.07	13.64	1.92	8.15	5.40	2:44.56	5865	
	Tomáš Dvořák	Czech Republic	6.99	7.69	16.25	1.92	7.87	DNS	–	DNF	
	Sebastian Chmara	Poland	7.34	7.11	14.17	2.10	DNS	–	–	DNF	
	Francisco Javier Benet	Spain	7.21	NM	13.30	DNS	–	–	–	DNF	
	Michael Kohnle	Germany	DNS	–	–	–	–	–	–	DNS	
	Dirk-Achim Pajonk	Germany	DNS	–	–	–	–	–	–	DNS	
