= 1997 World Championships in Athletics – Men's decathlon =

These are the official results of the Men's Decathlon competition at the 1997 World Championships in Athens, Greece. There were a total number of 34 participating athletes, including fourteen non-finishers. The competition started on August 5, 1997, and ended on August 6, 1997. At over 41%, this edition of the men's decathlon is notable for having the highest fraction of athletes not finishing the competition in the World Championships history. This was equalled 20 years later during the 2017 World Championships in Athletics.

== Medalists ==
Gold	Tomáš Dvořák; Czech Republic (CZE)
Silver	Eduard Hämäläinen; Finland (FIN)
Bronze	Frank Busemann; Germany (GER)

== Schedule ==
Tuesday, August 5
1. 100 m
2. Long Jump
3. Shot Put
4. High Jump
5. 400 m

Wednesday, August 6
6. 110 m hurdles
7. Discus Throw
8. Pole Vault
9. Javelin Throw
10. 1,500 m

== Records ==
Standing records prior to the 1997 World Athletics Championships
World Record	Dan O'Brien (USA)	8891	September 5, 1992	Talence, France
Event Record	Dan O'Brien (USA)	8817	August 20, 1993	Stuttgart, Germany
Season Best	Steve Fritz (USA)	8604	June 13, 1997	Indianapolis, United States

== Results ==
The highest mark recorded in each event is highlighted in yellow. These marks were split between nine competitors with the gold medallist claiming the mark for the javelin throw.

Rank	Athlete	Decathlon										Points
Rank	Athlete	1	2	3	4	5	6	7	8	9	10	Points
1st place, gold medalist(s)	Tomáš Dvořák (CZE)	10,60	7.64	16.32	2.00	47,56	13,61	45.16	5.00	70.34	4.35,40	8837
2nd place, silver medalist(s)	Eduard Hämäläinen (FIN)	10,81	7.56	15.71	1.97	46,71	13,74	50.50	5.20	59.82	4.37,10	8730
3rd place, bronze medalist(s)	Frank Busemann (GER)	10,76	7.96	13.53	2.09	48,32	13,55	42.56	5.00	63.92	4.29,27	8652
4	Steve Fritz (USA)	10,96	7.30	14.41	2.00	48,70	14,08	48.88	5.00	65.24	4.31,14	8463
5	Ramil Ganiyev (UZB)	10,94	7.58	14.76	2.06	48,34	14,35	46.04	5.30	55.14	4.36,78	8445
6	Erki Nool (EST)	10,67	7.37	14.33	1.91	46,99	14,66	43.20	5.40	65.84	4.42,98	8413
7	Stefan Schmid (GER)	10,93	7.58	14.58	1.97	48,14	14,49	44.38	5.00	67.46	4.43,20	8360
8	Michael Smith (CAN)	11,04	7.25	17.54	2.03	49,67	14,68	47.80	4.80	65.58	4.54,99	8307
9	Roman Šebrle (CZE)	10,91	7.71	14.33	2.09	48,16	14,32	43.32	4.20	64.76	4.40,31	8232
10	Klaus Isekenmeier (GER)	11,05	7.56	14.28	1.91	48,56	14,40	47.88	4.60	65.84	4.42,54	8180
11	Indrek Kaseorg (EST)	11,39	7.16	13.87	2.03	48,66	14,49	41.64	4.90	63.34	4.20,82	8140
12	Philipp Huber (SUI)	11,08	7.18	14.29	1.85	48,00	14,65	44.88	5.00	58.22	4.20,90	8107
13	Cédric Lopez (FRA)	11,21	7.13	13.48	2.09	48,88	14,75	40.96	4.60	64.88	4.25,96	8047
14	Marcel Dost (NED)	10,97	7.45	13.61	1.91	47,99	14,49	42.42	5.20	51.80	4.36,68	8040
15	Francisco Javier Benet (ESP)	11,04	7.19	13.66	2.03	48,49	14,56	43.30	4.50	55.92	4.33,65	7929
16	Prodromos Korkizoglou (GRE)	10,77	7.29	13.28	2.00	49,59	14,47	44.46	4.80	54.94	4.58,44	7867
17	Victor Houston (BAR)	10,72	7.57	12.82	2.03	47,91	13,92	33.56	3.50	62.10	4.32,30	7777
18	Mário Aníbal (POR)	11,09	7.03	14.57	2.03	49,73	15,28	44.28	4.60	53.70	4.39,65	7768
19	Pierre-Alexandre Vial (FRA)	11.02	7.11	13.35	1.88	48,87	14,83	43.26	4.80	53.70	4.42,29	7708
20	Oleg Veretelnikov (UZB)	11,10	7.32	13.93	1.85	48,85	15,39	39.70	4.40	60.28	4.25,68	7698
—	Chris Huffins (USA)	10.39	7.85	15.28	2.06	49,05	14,04	49.22	4.60	NM	DNS	DNF
—	Jagan Hames (AUS)	11.11	7.27	14.08	2.24	49,92	14,36	46.68	DNF	—	—	DNF
—	Lev Lobodin (RUS)	11.07	7.07	15.00		49,02	14,38	44.78	DNF	—	—	DNF
—	Beniamino Poserina (ITA)	11.10	6.93	14.04	1.91	49,99	14,56	38.42	DNS	—	—	DNF
—	Robert Změlík (CZE)	10.84	7.28	14.38		49,39	DNF	45.72	DNS	—	—	DNF
—	Sebastian Chmara (POL)	11.17	7.56	15.21		48,24	—	—	—	—	—	DNF
—	Sébastien Levicq (FRA)	11.25	7.01	13.58	1.94	53,43	—	—	—	—	—	DNF
—	Jón Arnar Magnússon (ISL)	10.61	7.42	15.05	2.00	DNS	—	—	—	—	—	DNF
—	Jaime Peñas (ESP)	11.08	7.16	15.33		DNS	—	—	—	—	—	DNF
—	Shawn Wilbourn (USA)	10.88	6.94	14.85	1.91	DNS	—	—	—	—	—	DNF
—	Rojs Piziks (LAT)	11.77	6.79	14.05		DNS	—	—	—	—	—	DNF
—	Alper Kasapoğlu (TUR)	11.28	6.91	13.99	1.85	DNS	—	—	—	—	—	DNF
—	Doug Pirini (NZL)	10.93	7.17	14.38	NM	—	—	—	—	—	—	DNF
—	Jack Rosendaal (NED)	11.27	6.94	12.73	—	—	—	—	—	—	—	DNF

== See also ==
- 1996 Men's Olympic Decathlon
- 1997 Hypo-Meeting
- 1997 Decathlon Year Ranking
- 1998 Men's European Championships Decathlon
