= 1999 IAAF World Indoor Championships – Men's heptathlon =

The men's heptathlon event at the 1999 IAAF World Indoor Championships was held on March 6–7.

== Medalists ==
Gold	Silver	Bronze
Sebastian Chmara; Poland	Erki Nool; Estonia	Roman Šebrle; Czech Republic

== Results ==
=== 60 metres ===
Rank	Lane	Name	Nationality	Time	Points	Notes
1	6	Chris Huffins	United States	6.67	1003	
2	7	Erki Nool	Estonia	6.83	944	
3	7	Lev Lobodin	Russia	6.87	929	PB
4	2	Roman Šebrle	Czech Republic	6.94	904	
5	3	Tomáš Dvořák	Czech Republic	6.95	900	PB
6	5	Jón Arnar Magnússon	Iceland	6.99	886	
7	1	Dezső Szabó	Hungary	7.05	865	PB
8	4	Sebastian Chmara	Poland	7.14	833	PB

=== Long jump ===
Rank	Athlete	Nationality	#1	#2	#3	Result	Points	Notes	Overall
1	Erki Nool	Estonia	7.36	7.28	7.80	7.80	1010	PB	1954
2	Roman Šebrle	Czech Republic	7.58	7.44	7.76	7.76	1000	PB	1904
3	Jón Arnar Magnússon	Iceland	7.40	x	7.69	7.69	982	NR	1868
4	Sebastian Chmara	Poland	7.54	7.50	7.62	7.62	965	PB	1798
5	Tomáš Dvořák	Czech Republic	7.45	7.61	7.56	7.61	962		1862
6	Chris Huffins	United States	7.43	7.41	x	7.43	918	PB	1921
7	Dezső Szabó	Hungary	7.09	x	7.29	7.29	883		1748
8	Lev Lobodin	Russia	6.88	6.96	7.16	7.16	852	PB	1781

=== Shot put ===
Rank	Athlete	Nationality	#1	#2	#3	Result	Points	Notes	Overall
1	Tomáš Dvořák	Czech Republic	16.70	15.90	x	16.70	894	PB	2756
2	Jón Arnar Magnússon	Iceland	16.08	16.08	x	16.08	856		2724
3	Sebastian Chmara	Poland	14.78	14.94	15.89	15.89	844	PB	2642
4	Lev Lobodin	Russia	15.85	x	15.32	15.85	842	PB	2623
5	Chris Huffins	United States	15.53	15.09	15.07	15.53	822		2743
6	Roman Šebrle	Czech Republic	14.06	14.24	15.27	15.27	806		2710
7	Erki Nool	Estonia	14.16	14.81	14.87	14.87	782	PB	2736
8	Dezső Szabó	Hungary	11.80	13.89	x	13.89	722	PB	2470

=== High jump ===
Rank	Athlete	Nationality	1.87	1.90	1.93	1.96	1.99	2.02	2.05	2.08	2.11	2.14	Result	Points	Notes	Overall
1	Roman Šebrle	Czech Republic	–	–	–	o	o	o	o	o	o	xxx	2.11	906		3616
2	Sebastian Chmara	Poland	–	–	–	o	–	o	o	xo	o	xxx	2.11	906	PB	3548
3	Jón Arnar Magnússon	Iceland	–	o	–	o	o	xxo	xxx				2.02	822		3546
3	Dezső Szabó	Hungary	o	–	o	o	o	xxo	xxx				2.02	822	PB	3292
5	Tomáš Dvořák	Czech Republic	xo	–	o	o	xxo	xxx					1.99	794		3550
6	Lev Lobodin	Russia	o	–	xo	xo	xxx						1.96	767		3390
7	Chris Huffins	United States	–	–	–	xxo	–	xxx					1.96	767		3510
8	Erki Nool	Estonia	–	o	o	xxx							1.93	740		3476

=== 60 metres hurdles ===
Rank	Lane	Name	Nationality	Time	Points	Notes	Overall
1	8	Lev Lobodin	Russia	7.81	1030	PB	4420
2	7	Tomáš Dvořák	Czech Republic	7.84	1022		4572
3	3	Chris Huffins	United States	7.91	1005		4515
4	4	Roman Šebrle	Czech Republic	7.94	997		4613
5	2	Sebastian Chmara	Poland	8.05	997		4517
6	5	Jón Arnar Magnússon	Iceland	8.09	959		4505
7	1	Erki Nool	Estonia	8.16	942		4418
8	6	Dezső Szabó	Hungary	8.18	937	PB	4229

=== Pole vault ===
Rank	Athlete	Nationality	4.40	4.60	4.80	4.90	5.00	5.10	5.20	5.30	5.40	5.50	5.60	Result	Points	Notes	Overall
1	Erki Nool	Estonia	–	–	–	–	–	–	o	–	o	xxo	xxx	5.50	1067	PB	5485
2	Sebastian Chmara	Poland	–	–	o	–	o	o	o	xxx				5.20	972		5489
2	Dezső Szabó	Hungary	–	–	o	–	o	o	o	xxx				5.20	972		5201
4	Lev Lobodin	Russia	–	–	xxo	–	o	o	xxx					5.10	941	PB	5361
5	Jón Arnar Magnússon	Iceland	–	–	o	–	o	xxx						5.00	910	PB	5415
6	Tomáš Dvořák	Czech Republic	–	xo	xo	o	xxx							4.90	880	PB	5452
7	Roman Šebrle	Czech Republic	o	o	o	xxx								4.80	849		5462
	Chris Huffins	United States												DNS	0		DNF

=== 1000 metres ===
Rank	Name	Nationality	Time	Points	Notes
1	Sebastian Chmara	Poland	2:37.86	897	
2	Erki Nool	Estonia	2:38.62	889	PB
3	Jón Arnar Magnússon	Iceland	2:39.55	878	PB
4	Tomáš Dvořák	Czech Republic	2:41.48	857	
5	Roman Šebrle	Czech Republic	2:41.50	857	
6	Dezső Szabó	Hungary	2:41.50	828	PB
7	Lev Lobodin	Russia	2:47.48	792	PB

=== Final standings ===
The highest mark recorded in each event is highlighted in yellow

Rank	Athlete	Nationality	60m	LJ	SP	HJ	60m H	PV	1000m	Points	Notes
1st place, gold medalist(s)	Sebastian Chmara	Poland	7.14	7.62	15.89	2.11	8.05	5.20	2:37.86	6386	WL
2nd place, silver medalist(s)	Erki Nool	Estonia	6.83	7.80	14.87	1.93	8.16	5.50	2:38.62	6374	NR
3rd place, bronze medalist(s)	Roman Šebrle	Czech Republic	6.94	7.76	15.27	2.11	7.94	4.80	2:41.50	6319	NR
4	Tomáš Dvořák	Czech Republic	6.95	7.61	16.70	1.99	7.84	4.90	2:41.48	6309	PB
5	Jón Arnar Magnússon	Iceland	6.99	7.69	16.08	2.02	8.09	5.00	2:39.55	6293	NR
6	Lev Lobodin	Russia	6.87	7.16	15.85	1.96	7.81	5.10	2:47.48	6153	
7	Dezső Szabó	Hungary	7.05	7.29	13.89	2.02	8.18	5.20	2:44.14	6029	
	Chris Huffins	United States	6.67	7.43	15.53	1.96	7.91	DNS	–	DNF	
