= 1998 IAAF Combined Events Challenge =

The 1998 IAAF Combined Events Challenge was the first edition of the annual competition for decathletes and heptathletes, organised by the world's governing body IAAF.

== Men's ranking ==
Rank	Athlete	First Meet		Second Meet		Third Meet		Points
Rank	Athlete	Points	Venue	Points	Venue	Points	Venue	Points
1st place, gold medalist(s)	Erki Nool (EST)	8672	Götzis	8628	Tallinn	8667	Budapest	25967
2nd place, silver medalist(s)	Jón Arnar Magnússon (ISL)	8573	Götzis	8583	Reykjavik	8552	Budapest	25708
3rd place, bronze medalist(s)	Roman Šebrle (CZE)	8538	Götzis	8589	Tallinn	8477	Budapest	25604
4	Tomáš Dvořák (CZE)	8592	Götzis	8428	Uniondale	8506	Budapest	25526
5	Lev Lobodin (RUS)	8414	Götzis	8571	Budapest	8290	Talence	25275
6	Eduard Hämäläinen (FIN)	8136	Uniondale	8587	Budapest	8200	Talence	24923
7	Sebastian Chmara (POL)	8332	Götzis	8067	Brixen	8303	Talence	24702
8	Mike Smith (CAN)	8228	Götzis	8171	Uniondale	8144	Kuala Lumpur	24543
9	Klaus Isekenmeier (GER)	8135	Götzis	8236	Ratingen	8140	Budapest	24511
10	Jagan Hames (AUS)	7868	Hobart	8040	Sydney	8490	Kuala Lumpur	24398
11	Philipp Huber (SUI)	8051	Götzis	7931	Tallinn	8081	Budapest	24063
12	Zsolt Kürtösi (HUN)	8002	Götzis	7883	Tallinn	8140	Budapest	24025
13	Jack Rosendaal (NED)	8269	Tallinn	8135	Budapest	7486	Talence	23890
14	Bart Bennema (NED)	7995	Götzis	7771	Tallinn	7638	Dordrecht	23404
15	Gaëtan Blouin (FRA)	7738	Val-de-Reuil	7683	Tallinn	7549	Budapest	22970
