= 2003 IAAF World Indoor Championships – Men's heptathlon =

The men's heptathlon event at the 2003 IAAF World Indoor Championships was held on March 15–16.

== Medalists ==
| Gold | Silver | Bronze |
|---|---|---|
| Tom Pappas; United States | Lev Lobodin; Russia | Roman Šebrle; Czech Republic |

== Results ==
=== 60 metres ===
| Rank | Lane | Name | Nationality | Time | Points | Notes |
|---|---|---|---|---|---|---|
| 1 | 1 | Tom Pappas | United States | 6.89 | 922 | PB |
| 2 | 3 | Lev Lobodin | Russia | 6.95 | 900 | |
| 3 | 4 | Roman Šebrle | Czech Republic | 7.07 | 858 | |
| 4 | 7 | Erki Nool | Estonia | 7.08 | 854 | |
| 5 | 4 | Aleksandr Pogorelov | Russia | 7.11 | 844 | PB |
| 6 | 6 | Jón Arnar Magnússon | Iceland | 7.14 | 833 | |
| 7 | 2 | Laurent Hernu | France | 7.15 | 830 | |
| 8 | 8 | Tomáš Dvořák | Czech Republic | 7.17 | 823 | |

=== Long jump ===
| Rank | Athlete | Nationality | #1 | #2 | #3 | Result | Points | Notes | Overall |
|---|---|---|---|---|---|---|---|---|---|
| 1 | Jón Arnar Magnússon | Iceland | 7.63 | 7.46 | X | 7.63 | 967 | | 1800 |
| 2 | Roman Šebrle | Czech Republic | 7.48 | 7.45 | 7.62 | 7.62 | 965 | | 1823 |
| 3 | Tom Pappas | United States | 7.53 | 7.56 | X | 7.56 | 950 | PB | 1872 |
| 4 | Erki Nool | Estonia | X | 7.38 | 5.69 | 7.38 | 905 | | 1759 |
| 5 | Aleksandr Pogorelov | Russia | 7.15 | 7.20 | 7.37 | 7.37 | 903 | | 1747 |
| 6 | Laurent Hernu | France | 7.14 | 7.34 | 7.10 | 7.34 | 896 | | 1726 |
| 7 | Lev Lobodin | Russia | 6.98 | 7.07 | 7.22 | 7.22 | 866 | | 1766 |
| 8 | Tomáš Dvořák | Czech Republic | 7.21 | X | X | 7.21 | 864 | | 1687 |

=== Shot put ===
| Rank | Athlete | Nationality | #1 | #2 | #3 | Result | Points | Notes | Overall |
|---|---|---|---|---|---|---|---|---|---|
| 1 | Lev Lobodin | Russia | 16.20 | 16.03 | 16.51 | 16.51 | 883 | | 2649 |
| 2 | Tom Pappas | United States | 15.87 | 15.78 | 16.23 | 16.23 | 865 | PB | 2737 |
| 3 | Jón Arnar Magnússon | Iceland | 15.31 | 16.20 | 15.55 | 16.20 | 864 | | 2664 |
| 4 | Tomáš Dvořák | Czech Republic | 15.46 | 15.99 | 16.00 | 16.00 | 851 | | 2538 |
| 5 | Roman Šebrle | Czech Republic | 15.20 | X | 14.85 | 15.20 | 802 | | 2625 |
| 6 | Aleksandr Pogorelov | Russia | 14.33 | 14.06 | 14.87 | 14.87 | 782 | | 2529 |
| 7 | Laurent Hernu | France | 13.92 | 13.84 | 14.07 | 14.07 | 733 | | 2459 |
| | Erki Nool | Estonia | X | X | X | NM | 0 | | 1759 |

=== High jump ===
| Rank | Athlete | Nationality | 1.84 | 1.87 | 1.90 | 1.93 | 1.96 | 1.99 | 2.02 | 2.05 | 2.08 | 2.11 | 2.14 | 2.17 | 2.20 | Result | Points | Notes | Overall |
|---|---|---|---|---|---|---|---|---|---|---|---|---|---|---|---|---|---|---|---|
| 1 | Tom Pappas | United States | – | – | – | – | o | – | o | – | o | o | o | xo | xxx | 2.17 | 963 | | 3700 |
| 2 | Aleksandr Pogorelov | Russia | – | – | – | – | o | – | o | o | o | xxo | xxx | | | 2.11 | 906 | PB | 3435 |
| 3 | Roman Šebrle | Czech Republic | – | – | – | – | o | – | xo | o | o | xxx | | | | 2.08 | 878 | | 3503 |
| 4 | Lev Lobodin | Russia | – | – | o | – | xo | o | xo | o | xxx | | | | | 2.05 | 850 | | 3499 |
| 5 | Jón Arnar Magnússon | Iceland | – | o | – | o | o | o | o | xxx | | | | | | 2.02 | 822 | | 3486 |
| 6 | Tomáš Dvořák | Czech Republic | o | – | o | – | o | o | xxo | xxx | | | | | | 2.02 | 822 | | 3360 |
| 7 | Laurent Hernu | France | – | – | – | o | xxo | o | xxo | xxx | | | | | | 2.02 | 822 | | 3281 |
| | Erki Nool | Estonia | | | | | | | | | | | | | | DNS | 0 | | DNF |

=== 60 metres hurdles ===
| Rank | Lane | Name | Nationality | Time | Points | Notes | Overall |
|---|---|---|---|---|---|---|---|
| 1 | 6 | Tom Pappas | United States | 7.80 | 1033 | PB | 4733 |
| 2 | 4 | Lev Lobodin | Russia | 7.89 | 1010 | | 4509 |
| 3 | 5 | Roman Šebrle | Czech Republic | 8.02 | 977 | | 4480 |
| 4 | 2 | Aleksandr Pogorelov | Russia | 8.03 | 974 | PB | 4409 |
| 5 | 7 | Laurent Hernu | France | 8.03 | 974 | | 4255 |
| 6 | 3 | Tomáš Dvořák | Czech Republic | 8.04 | 972 | | 4332 |
| 7 | 1 | Jón Arnar Magnússon | Iceland | 8.06 | 967 | | 4453 |

=== Pole vault ===
| Rank | Athlete | Nationality | 4.30 | 4.40 | 4.50 | 4.60 | 4.70 | 4.80 | 4.90 | 5.00 | 5.10 | 5.20 | 5.30 | 5.40 | Result | Points | Notes | Overall |
|---|---|---|---|---|---|---|---|---|---|---|---|---|---|---|---|---|---|---|
| 1 | Lev Lobodin | Russia | – | – | – | – | – | o | – | o | o | o | o | xxx | 5.30 | 1004 | PB | 5513 |
| 2 | Jón Arnar Magnússon | Iceland | – | – | – | o | – | o | o | xo | xo | xxx | | | 5.10 | 941 | PB | 5394 |
| 3 | Roman Šebrle | Czech Republic | – | – | o | – | xxo | o | o | xo | xxx | | | | 5.00 | 910 | PB | 5390 |
| 4 | Tom Pappas | United States | – | – | – | o | – | o | o | xxx | | | | | 4.90 | 880 | | 5613 |
| 5 | Laurent Hernu | France | – | – | – | o | – | o | xo | xxx | | | | | 4.90 | 880 | | 5135 |
| 6 | Aleksandr Pogorelov | Russia | – | – | o | – | o | o | xxx | | | | | | 4.80 | 849 | | 5258 |
| 7 | Tomáš Dvořák | Czech Republic | o | – | o | o | o | xxx | | | | | | | 4.70 | 819 | | 5151 |

=== 1000 metres ===
| Rank | Name | Nationality | Time | Points | Notes |
|---|---|---|---|---|---|
| 1 | Tomáš Dvořák | Czech Republic | 2:41.79 | 854 | |
| 2 | Laurent Hernu | France | 2:41.83 | 853 | PB |
| 3 | Roman Šebrle | Czech Republic | 2:46.20 | 806 | |
| 4 | Jón Arnar Magnússon | Iceland | 2:47.60 | 791 | |
| 5 | Lev Lobodin | Russia | 2:48.25 | 784 | |
| 6 | Tom Pappas | United States | 2:51.65 | 748 | PB |
| 7 | Aleksandr Pogorelov | Russia | 2:52.36 | 741 | |

=== Final results ===
The highest mark recorded in each event is highlighted in yellow

| Rank | Athlete | Nationality | 60m | LJ | SP | HJ | 60m H | PV | 1000m | Points | Notes |
|---|---|---|---|---|---|---|---|---|---|---|---|
| 1st place, gold medalist(s) | Tom Pappas | United States | 6.89 | 7.56 | 16.23 | 2.17 | 7.80 | 4.90 | 2:51.65 | 6361 | PB |
| 2nd place, silver medalist(s) | Lev Lobodin | Russia | 6.95 | 7.22 | 16.51 | 2.05 | 7.89 | 5.30 | 2:48.25 | 6297 | |
| 3rd place, bronze medalist(s) | Roman Šebrle | Czech Republic | 7.07 | 7.62 | 15.20 | 2.08 | 8.02 | 5.00 | 2:46.20 | 6196 | |
| 4 | Jón Arnar Magnússon | Iceland | 7.14 | 7.63 | 16.20 | 2.02 | 8.06 | 5.10 | 2:47.60 | 6185 | SB |
| 5 | Tomáš Dvořák | Czech Republic | 7.17 | 7.21 | 16.00 | 2.02 | 8.04 | 4.70 | 2:41.79 | 6005 | SB |
| 6 | Aleksandr Pogorelov | Russia | 7.11 | 7.37 | 14.87 | 2.11 | 8.03 | 4.80 | 2:52.36 | 5999 | |
| 7 | Laurent Hernu | France | 7.15 | 7.34 | 14.07 | 2.02 | 8.03 | 4.90 | 2:41.83 | 5988 | |
| | Erki Nool | Estonia | 7.08 | 7.38 | NM | DNS | – | – | – | DNF | |
