= 1994 European Athletics Championships – Men's decathlon =

Men's decathlon at the European Athletics Championships

The men's decathlon competition at the 1994 European Athletics Championships in Helsinki, Finland, was held at Helsinki Olympic Stadium on 12 August and 13 August 1994.

== Medalists ==
Gold	Alain Blondel; France (FRA)
Silver	Henrik Dagård; Sweden (SWE)
Bronze	Lev Lobodin; Ukraine (UKR)

== Schedule ==
12 August
1. 100 m
2. Long jump
3. Shot put
4. High jump
5. 400 m

13 August
6. 110 m hurdles
7. Discus throw
8. Pole vault
9. Javelin throw
10. 1,500 m

== Records ==
World record	Dan O'Brien (USA)	8891	5 September 1992	Talence, France
Event record	Daley Thompson (GBR)	8811	28 August 1986	Stuttgart, West Germany

== Results ==
The best mark in each event is highlighted.

Rank	Athlete	Decathlon										Points
Rank	Athlete	1	2	3	4	5	6	7	8	9	10	Points
1st place, gold medalist(s)	Alain Blondel (FRA)	11.12	7.50	13.78	1.99	48.91	14.18	45.08	5.40	60.64	4:20.48	8453
2nd place, silver medalist(s)	Henrik Dagård (SWE)	10.69	7.45	14.93	1.93	46.71	14.15	44.36	4.80	62.52	4:40.49	8362
3rd place, bronze medalist(s)	Lev Lobodin (UKR)	10.86	7.30	15.34	1.99	48.78	14.31	45.50	5.00	50.14	4:31.80	8201
4	Christian Plaziat (FRA)	11.05	7.66	14.30	1.96	49.08	14.18	42.80	4.80	56.70	4:33.72	8127
5	Stefan Schmid (GER)	10.87	7.43	13.49	1.96	48.99	14.72	41.34	4.70	64.88	4:26.51	8109
6	Sándor Munkácsi (HUN)	11.14	7.65	13.02	1.93	48.38	14.24	42.00	4.70	56.94	4:20.27	8071
7	Tomáš Dvořák (CZE)	10.90	7.69	14.55	2.02	48.94	14.25	42.84	4.00	59.54	4:29.69	8065
8	Dezső Szabó (HUN)	11.02	7.39	12.87	1.93	48.63	14.68	40.38	5.20	50.06	4:17.23	7995
9	Vitaliy Kolpakov (UKR)	11.25	7.33	15.00	2.05	49.14	14.79	47.14	4.60	54.26	4:42.48	7987
10	Erki Nool (EST)	10.73	7.83	13.21	1.96	48.20	15.27	36.44	5.20	52.78	4:43.91	7953
11	Andrei Nazarov (EST)	10.99	7.22	13.14	2.02	49.65	14.31	43.54	4.80	54.02	4:42.10	7894
12	Francisco Javier Benet (ESP)	11.36	7.07	12.78	1.87	49.34	14.40	43.80	4.80	63.28	4:31.34	7836
13	Dirk-Achim Pajonk (GER)	10.93	7.23	14.01	1.96	49.72	15.08	41.28	4.40	52.28	4:22.68	7746
14	Philipp Huber (SUI)	11.23	7.08	14.01	1.87	48.20	15.07	40.74	4.70	50.66	4:17.46	7725
15	Mikko Valle (FIN)	11.09	7.04	11.82	1.90	49.67	15.21	40.82	5.00	67.80	4:53.75	7670
16	Mirko Spada (SUI)	11.44	6.98	14.87	1.90	49.86	14.49	44.02	4.50	54.68	4:36.81	7669
17	Jarkko Finni (FIN)	10.99	7.20	13.52	1.96	51.44	15.38	40.04	4.70	60.46	4:44.83	7623
18	Marcel Dost (NED)	11.15	7.26	12.90	1.87	49.79	14.93	41.26	4.70	51.82	4:38.60	7547
19	Alper Kasapoğlu (TUR)	10.96	7.35	12.82	1.90	49.67	14.80	39.22	4.50	49.76	4:37.96	7529
20	Indrek Kaseorg (EST)	11.41	7.38	13.25	2.05	48.66	14.35	40.64	—	62.36	4:20.79	7272
21	Rojs Piziks (LAT)	11.75	6.69	13.46	2.02	53.62	15.78	42.58	4.40	51.96	4:40.06	7118
—	Rolf Schläfli (SUI)	11.09	6.77	13.41	1.99	47.71	15.52	40.42	DNS	—	—	DNF
—	Eduard Hämäläinen (BLR)	10.77	7.54	15.70	2.08	47.28	DNF	DNS	—	—	—	DNF
—	William Motti (FRA)	11.54	7.32	15.65	2.11	DNS	—	—	—	—	—	DNF
—	Thorsten Dauth (GER)	10.83	7.30	14.71	1.96	DNS	—	—	—	—	—	DNF
—	Antonio Peñalver (ESP)	11.21	7.35	15.82	1.93	DNS	—	—	—	—	—	DNF
—	Jón Arnar Magnússon (ISL)	10.83	X	14.12	DNS	—	—	—	—	—	—	DNF
—	Álvaro Burrell (ESP)	10.98 (w: 1.7 m/s)	NM	DNS	—	—	—	—	—	—	—	DNF

== Participation ==
According to an unofficial count, 28 athletes from 15 countries participated in the event.

- Belarus (1)
- Czech Republic (1)
- Estonia (3)
- Finland (2)
- France (3)
- Germany (3)
- Hungary (2)
- Iceland (1)
- Latvia (1)
- Netherlands (1)
- Spain (3)
- Sweden (1)
- Switzerland (3)
- Turkey (1)
- Ukraine (2)

== See also ==
- 1993 Men's World Championships Decathlon
- 1994 Hypo-Meeting
- 1994 Decathlon Year Ranking
- 1995 Men's World Championships Decathlon
