= Athletics at the 1993 Summer Universiade – Men's decathlon =

The men's decathlon event at the 1993 Summer Universiade was held at the UB Stadium in Buffalo, United States on 17 and 18 July 1993.

The winning margin was just ten points which as of 2024 remains the only time the men's decathlon has been won by fewer than twenty points at these games.

== Results ==
The highest mark recorded in each event is highlighted in yellow

Rank	Athlete	Nationality	100m	LJ	SP	HJ	400m	110m H	DT	PV	JT	1500m	Points	Notes
1st place, gold medalist(s)	Sébastien Levicq	France	11.22	6.99	12.87	1.98	51.48	14.96	41.14	5.10	63.46	4:23.74	7874	
2nd place, silver medalist(s)	Indrek Kaseorg	Estonia	11.36	7.34	11.81	2.07	49.21	14.47	35.82	4.60	59.74	4:14.00	7864	
3rd place, bronze medalist(s)	Dan Steele	United States	10.88	7.21	13.57	1.89	48.98	14.46	41.62	4.40	56.98	4:54.09	7653	
4	Udo Jacobasch	Germany	11.32	6.82	13.90	1.95	50.75	14.69	44.34	4.70	54.92	4:42.79	7606	
5	Ubaldo Ranzi	Italy	10.81	7.26	12.40	2.01	49.64	15.15	36.40	4.40	54.66	4:40.24	7545	
6	Kamil Damašek	Czech Republic	11.36	6.84	14.09	1.98	49.49	15.44	36.46	4.40	52.86	4:32.93	7392	
7	Rick Schwieger	United States	11.32	6.98	12.83	2.07	50.55	15.16	33.58	4.60	52.10	4:41.71	7359	
8	Michael Nolan	Canada	11.49	6.88	11.94	1.95	50.63	15.92	41.62	4.80	49.16	4:34.71	7266	
9	Barry Thomas	Great Britain	11.37	6.92	12.98	1.89	52.70	15.07	36.44	4.80	55.68	4:48.64	7223	
10	Krasimir Petlichki	Bulgaria	11.29	6.95	12.76	1.98	51.30	15.34	36.56	3.80	54.74	4:43.08	7079	
11	Fernando Luis Benet	Spain	11.57	6.72	12.45	1.92	51.11	15.51	35.08	4.40	52.52	4:41.86	6995	
12	Alper Kasapoğlu	Turkey	11.30	6.94	12.64	1.86	51.52	15.11	38.74	4.20	46.70	4:49.47	6974	
	Peter Winter	Australia	10.86	7.18	12.84	2.01	48.80	14.72	38.90	4.20	53.28	DNS	DNF	
	José Roman	Puerto Rico	11.44	6.73	13.57	1.89	54.48	15.87	39.73	4.40	57.02	DNS	DNF	
	José Arnaiz	Spain	11.02	6.74	11.46	1.87	50.58	14.98	30.73	4.00	38.33	DNS	DNF	
	Aleksander Bogdanov	Ukraine	11.10	6.92	12.16	2.07	49.38	14.38	38.15	4.00	DNS	–	DNF	
	Christopher Mene	New Zealand	11.79	6.51	13.40	1.89	55.89	DNF	47.37	DNS	–	–	DNF	
	Brendan Tennant	Australia	11.21	7.04	13.59	1.86	51.59	DNS	–	–	–	–	DNF	
	Ronalds Blums	Latvia	11.50	6.97	12.92	NM	DNS	–	–	–	–	–	DNF	
	Jim Stevenson	Great Britain	11.15	NM	DNS	–	–	–	–	–	–	–	DNF	
	Matthew Dallow	New Zealand	?	?	?	?	?	?	?	?	?	?	DNF	
