= 1992 World Junior Championships in Athletics – Men's decathlon =

The men's decathlon event at the 1992 World Junior Championships in Athletics was held in Seoul, South Korea, at Olympic Stadium on 16 and 17 September.

== Medalists ==
Gold	Raúl Duany; Cuba
Silver	Bernhard Floder; Germany
Bronze	Renco van Veldhuizen; Netherlands

== Results ==
=== Final ===
16/17 September

The highest mark recorded in each event is highlighted in yellow

Rank	Name	Nationality	100m	LJ	SP	HJ	400m	110m H	DT	PV	JT	1500m	Points	Notes
1st place, gold medalist(s)	Raúl Duany	Cuba	11.45 (w: 1.5 m/s)	6.90	12.37	2.00	49.98	15.38 (w: -0.1 m/s)	33.08	4.10	63.48	4:16.17	7403	
2nd place, silver medalist(s)	Bernhard Floder	Germany	11.11 (w: 1.3 m/s)	7.22	12.07	1.94	49.60	14.66 (w: 0.1 m/s)	36.18	4.20	52.24	4:32.43	7397	
3rd place, bronze medalist(s)	Renco van Veldhuizen	Netherlands	11.25 (w: 1.3 m/s)	6.57	13.87	1.94	48.09	14.98 (w: 0.1 m/s)	34.42	3.90	48.76	4:13.62	7313	
4	Les Kuorikoski	Australia	11.09 (w: 1.5 m/s)	6.63	13.33	1.88	49.84	15.89 (w: 1.1 m/s)	44.42	3.90	56.30	4:31.42	7280	
5	Philipp Huber	Switzerland	11.26 (w: 1.3 m/s)	6.87	12.16	1.79	49.48	15.35 (w: 1.1 m/s)	35.10	4.50	50.04	4:21.11	7188	
6	Christer Holger	Sweden	11.22 (w: 1.5 m/s)	7.21	11.56	1.88	50.02	15.23 (w: 0.1 m/s)	30.54	4.40	49.48	4:22.04	7173	
7	Stefan Vogt	Germany	11.31 (w: 1.5 m/s)	6.85	11.68	1.91	49.92	15.50 (w: 0.1 m/s)	37.12	4.50	49.84	4:32.30	7171	
8	Alain Schetty	Switzerland	11.39 (w: 1.3 m/s)	6.79	13.47	1.82	50.02	16.63 (w: -0.1 m/s)	40.76	4.20	55.54	4:32.22	7111	
9	Cédric Lopez	France	11.27 (w: 1.3 m/s)	6.64	11.41	1.88	51.25	15.27 (w: 1.1 m/s)	35.08	3.90	64.48	4:30.93	7071	
10	Ferry Zijl	Netherlands	11.49 (w: 0.0 m/s)	6.77	11.99	1.85	51.64	16.16 (w: 1.1 m/s)	39.14	4.60	55.28	4:37.09	7050	
11	Paul Jeffrey	Australia	11.30 (w: 1.3 m/s)	6.59	10.78	1.79	50.10	16.69 (w: -0.1 m/s)	36.04	4.30	60.86	4:32.96	6895	
12	Kamil Damašek	Czechoslovakia	11.51 (w: 1.5 m/s)	6.73	13.11	2.00	49.97	16.62 (w: 1.1 m/s)	32.78	3.90	51.78	4:35.51	6891	
13	Mike Nolan	Canada	11.49 (w: 0.0 m/s)	6.63	11.32	2.00	51.54	16.67 (w: 1.1 m/s)	37.64	4.20	41.60	4:39.26	6694	
14	Vitaliy Nagubniy	Commonwealth of Independent States	11.43 (w: 0.0 m/s)	6.77	12.03	2.03	50.94	15.42 (w: 0.1 m/s)	34.42	DNS	59.48	4:36.61	6521	
15	Abdul Marzouk Al-Shahrani	Saudi Arabia	11.56 (w: 0.0 m/s)	6.44	9.87	1.73	50.38	16.21 (w: -0.1 m/s)	30.84	4.00	43.58	4:32.75	6296	
16	Edemar dos Santos	Brazil	11.70 (w: 1.5 m/s)	6.41	10.43	1.73	50.25	15.92 (w: -0.1 m/s)	35.34	DNS	49.98	4:14.03	6025	
	Tom Erik Olsen	Norway	11.22 (w: 1.5 m/s)	6.79	12.36	1.94	51.51	15.14 (w: 0.1 m/s)	34.58	4.20	DNS	DNS	DNF	
	Bill Schuffenhauer	United States	11.26 (w: 1.3 m/s)	7.44	13.32	2.00	50.76	15.48 (w: 0.1 m/s)	41.10	DNS	DNS	DNS	DNF	
	Leo Hudec	Austria	11.17 (w: 0.0 m/s)	7.10	10.44	2.00	51.41	15.17 (w: 1.1 m/s)	28.88	DNS	DNS	DNS	DNF	
	Gines Hidalgo	Spain	11.27 (w: 0.0 m/s)	6.87	11.52	DNS	DNS	DNS (w: -0.1 m/s)	DNS	DNS	DNS	DNS	DNF	

== Participation ==
According to an unofficial count, 20 athletes from 16 countries participated in the event.

- Australia (2)
- Austria (1)
- Brazil (1)
- Canada (1)
- Commonwealth of Independent States (1)
- Cuba (1)
- Czechoslovakia (1)
- France (1)
- Germany (2)
- Netherlands (2)
- Norway (1)
- Saudi Arabia (1)
- Spain (1)
- Sweden (1)
- Switzerland (2)
- United States (1)
