= 1998 European Athletics Indoor Championships – Men's heptathlon =

The men's heptathlon event at the 1998 European Athletics Indoor Championships was held on 28 February–1 March.

== Results ==
The highest mark recorded in each event is highlighted in yellow

Rank	Athlete	Nationality	60m	LJ	SP	HJ	60m H	PV	1000m	Points	Notes
1st place, gold medalist(s)	Sebastian Chmara	Poland	7.12	7.65	15.70	2.17	7.98	5.20	2:42.31	6415	NR
2nd place, silver medalist(s)	Dezsõ Szabó	Hungary	7.00	7.50	14.40	2.02	8.09	5.30	2:38.12	6249	NR
3rd place, bronze medalist(s)	Lev Lobodin	Russia	6.83	7.35	15.60	1.99	7.79	5.00	2:45.05	6226	
4	Tomáš Dvořák	Czech Republic	6.95	7.47	16.47	1.99	7.79	4.70	2:44.89	6175	
5	Jón Arnar Magnússon	Iceland	6.90	7.48	15.19	1.99	8.03	5.10	2:45.65	6170	
6	Alex Averbukh	Russia	6.95	7.15	14.46	2.02	8.36	5.60	2:44.70	6144	
7	Indrek Kaseorg	Estonia	7.14	7.27	13.98	2.05	8.00	5.00	2:39.85	6055	
8	Francisco Javier Benet	Spain	7.02	7.33	14.41	2.02	7.88	4.60	2:37.75	6044	
9	Mike Maczey	Germany	7.14	7.26	14.41	2.05	8.03	4.90	2:42.22	6015	
10	Prodromos Korkizoglou	Greece	6.79	7.33	13.80	1.96	8.01	5.00	2:49.99	5989	
11	Mário Aníbal	Portugal	6.99	6.84	15.06	1.99	8.35	4.90	2:50.49	5785	
12	Bart Bennema	Netherlands	7.12	7.16	14.08	1.93	7.91	4.80	2:51.89	5765	
13	Jaime Peñas	Spain	7.12	7.16	15.51	2.05	8.70	4.80	3:05.01	5641	
	Marcel Dost	Netherlands	7.09	6.99	13.76	1.87	–	–	–	DNF	
	Roman Šebrle	Czech Republic	7.02	NM	–	–	–	–	–	DNF	
