= Prodromos Korkizoglou =

Greek decathlete

Personal information
- Born: 27 February 1975 (age 51) Larissa, Greece

Sport
- Sport: Decathlon
Medal record
Representing Greece
Mediterranean Games
Gold medal – first place	2001 Tunis	Decathlon
Bronze medal – third place	1997 Bari	Decathlon

Prodromos Korkizoglou (Greek: Πρόδρομος Κορκιζόγλου, born 27 February 1975) is a Greek decathlete. He is the current holder of the national decathlon record (8069 points) and his highest distinction was the gold medal at the 2001 Mediterranean Games. He also competed at two Olympic Games, two World Championships and one European Championships.

== Career ==
He was born in Larissa and represented the local club Pelasgos, alongside athletes such as Fani Halkia and Asimina Vanakara. He later joined Panellinios GS. Entering the decathlon 1994 World Junior Championships, he won the first event, the 100 metres. However, he no-heighted in the pole vault and therefore did not finish the event. He also competed in the 4 × 100 metres relay, being knocked out in the heats. Next, he finished thirteenth at the 1995 Summer Universiade.

His first finish in European competition was a twelfth place at the 1996 European Indoor Championships. Winning the 60 metres event, he placed between 6–13 in the other events. After he won the bronze medal at the 1997 Mediterranean Games, he was able to compete in his first World Championships, on home soil in Athens. Here he finished 16th. He also won the decathlon at the 1996 and 1998 Balkan Championships.

Korkizoglou improved from the 1996 edition to a 10th place at the 1998 European Athletics Indoor Championships, but subseequently failed to finish the 1998 European Championships. At the 1999 World Championships, he ended in a distant last place in the final 1500 metres, and came 13th overall.

A mainstay in the European Cup Combined Events, he recorded several high finishes in the Second League, before entering the First League competition in 2000 and winning. He did so in a Greek record of 8069 points, adding to his surpassing of the 8000-point barrier in 1999 and his Greek record in the indoor heptathlon of 6032 points from February 2000 in Pireaus. He finished sixth at the 2000 European Indoor Championships and fifteenth at the Hypo-Meeting in Götzis, before entering his first Olympic Games. He only competed during the first day of the decathlon, and thus did not finish. His victory at the 2001 Mediterranean Games would be his last international competition for some time.

Korkizoglou sustained an ankle injury in 2004, which failed to heal completely by the 2004 Olympics. He completed the decathlon competition, but ended 26th. Following a 20th place at the 2005 Hypo-Meeting and a ninth place at the European Cup Combined Events Second League in the samee year, he stopped competing. He had recorded lifetime bests in the shot put and javelin throw in 2005, though these were still his lowest-scoring events outside of the 1500 metres. His highest-scoring events were the 60/100 metres hurdles, the 60/100 metres and the long jump. He never became Greek champion individually, but won the national decathlon championships of 1996, 1998, 1999, 2002 and 2003.
