= Valeriy Belousov =

Russian decathlete (born 1970)

Personal information
- Born: January 22, 1970 (age 56) Volgograd, Soviet Union

Sport
- Sport: Decathlon

Valeriy Belousov (Russian: Валерий Белоусов; born January 22, 1970) is a retired male decathlete from Russia. He set his personal best (7235 points) in the decathlon on August 7, 1995, during the 1995 World Championships in Sweden.

== International competitions ==
Representing Russia
Year	Competition	Venue	Position	Event	Notes
1995	World Championships	Gothenburg, Sweden	19th	Decathlon	7235 points = PB
