= 1994 Hypo-Meeting =

The 20th edition of the annual Hypo-Meeting took place on 28 and 29 May 1994 in Götzis, Austria. The track and field competition featured a men's decathlon and a women's heptathlon event. Eduard Hämäläinen set a new meeting record with a total number of 8735 points.

== Men's Decathlon ==
=== Schedule ===
28 May
1. 100 m
2. Long Jump
3. Shot Put
4. High Jump
5. 400 m

29 May
6. 110 m hurdles
7. Discus Throw
8. Pole Vault
9. Javelin Throw
10. 1,500 m

=== Records ===
World Record	Dan O'Brien (USA)	8891	5 September 1992	Talence, France
Event Record	Daley Thompson (GBR)	8730	23 May 1982	Götzis, Austria

=== Results ===
Rank	Athlete	Decathlon										Points
Rank	Athlete	1	2	3	4	5	6	7	8	9	10	Points
1	Eduard Hämäläinen (BLR)	10,50	7.26	16.05	2.11	47,63	13,82	49.70	4.90	60.32	4.35,09	8735
2	Henrik Dagård (SWE)	10,45	7.35	14.44	1.99	47,44	14,27	45.64	4.50	64.12	4.35,50	8359
3	Stefan Schmid (GER)	10,76	7.25	14.31	1.96	48,69	14,75	43.38	4.70	66.34	4.28,35	8201
4	Michael Smith (CAN)	10,83	7.02	15.27	1.93	49,70	14,64	48.84	4.90	65.74	4.44,11	8191
5	Sébastien Levicq (FRA)	11,18	7.28	13.75	1.93	51,43	14,89	47.96	5.20	64.44	4.31,96	8105
6	Tomáš Dvořák (CZE)	10,76	7.53	15.10	1.99	49,47	14,16	39.84	4.40	59.48	4.34,44	8078
7	Alex Kruger (GBR)	11,22	7.45	14.63	2.14	50,04	15,09	43.44	4.80	57.08	4.34,86	8078
8	Sheldon Blockburger (USA)	10,60	7.67	14.73	2.11	53,76	14,83	42.74	4.70	60.88	4.45,52	8064
9	Lev Lobodin (RUS)	10,65	7.45	14.85	2.02	49,72	14,38	42.96	4.90	52.16	4.52,09	8050
10	Frank Müller (GER)	10,87	7.37	13.94	1.99	49,53	14,67	44.52	4.60	59.68	4.36,06	8023
11	Simon Shirley (GBR)	10,92	7.31	12.89	2.05	49,24	15,37	41.62	4.60	61.12	4.27,45	7936
12	Jón Arnar Magnússon (ISL)	10,80	7.63	14.31	1.99	50,28	14,73	45.80	4.70	52.16	4.57,33	7896
13	Mirko Spada (SUI)	11,46	7.12	15.19	1.87	50,30	14,60	48.56	4.60	60.72	4.35,76	7877
14	Brian Brophy (USA)	11,14	7.14	15.15	2.05	49,33	15,69	49.56	4.80	53.56	5.02,95	7834
15	Aleksandr Bogdanov (UKR)	10,92	7.00	13.61	1.99	48,81	14,55	43.94	4.60	52.10	4.40,13	7799
16	Udo Jacobasch (GER)	11,12	7.34	14.50	1.99	50,18	14,82	44.94	4.80	49.96	4.49,77	7783
17	Ramil Ganiyev (UZB)	11,10	7.42	14.06	2.05	50,07	15,11	44.88	4.90	50.86	5.01,01	7781
18	Indrek Kaseorg (EST)	11,33	6.99	13.30	2.05	48,59	14,52	38.22	4.70	57.76	4.36,46	7779
19	Christian Mandrou (FRA)	11,15	7.59	13.26	1.90	48,84	14,85	40.66	4.40	56.82	4.29,09	7768
20	Vitali Kolpakov (UKR)	10,93	7.33	14.68	2.05	48,52	14,38	44.68	4.40	54.18	5.25,31	7764
21	Stefan Schneider (SUI)	11,31	7.28	12.68	2.02	50,40	15,00	40.20	4.60	56.40	4.21,15	7737
22	Gerhard Röser (AUT)	11,07	7.28	14.37	1.90	50,13	15,57	40.54	4.40	53.42	4.47,95	7459
23	Ivan Brunner (SUI)	11,13	7.11	12.89	1.87	51,09	15,41	37.50	4.50	54.74	4.34,92	7332
—	Mikhail Medved (UKR)	11,04	7.14	15.23	2.02	51,14	14,85	50.66	4.90	39.36	—	DNF
—	Igor Matsanov (BLR)	11,00	7.16	14.75	1.84	50,59	14,99	38.34	4.80	50.06	—	DNF
—	Leonhard Hudec (AUT)	11,00	7.46	10.90	2.05	50,77	15,06	33.02	4.70	DNS	—	DNF
—	Harald Eder (AUT)	11,43	6.61	14.10	1.90	52,70	15,59	40.38	DNS	—	—	DNF
—	Erwin Reiterer (AUT)	11,31	DNS	—	—	—	—	—	—	—	—	DNF

== Women's Heptathlon ==
=== Schedule ===
28 May
1. 100 m hurdles
2. High Jump
3. Shot Put
4. 200 m

29 May
5. Long Jump
6. Javelin Throw
7. 800 m

=== Records ===
World Record	Jackie Joyner-Kersee (USA)	7291	24 September 1988	Seoul, South Korea
Event Record	Sabine Braun (GER)	6985	31 May 1992	Götzis, Austria

=== Results ===
Rank	Athlete	Heptathlon							Points
Rank	Athlete	1	2	3	4	5	6	7	Points
1	Sabine Braun (GER)								6665
2	Larisa Nikitina (RUS)								6596
3	Rita Ináncsi (HUN)								6573
4	Svetlana Moskalets (RUS)								6498
5	Beatrice Mau-Repnak (GER)								6349
6	Irina Tyukhay (RUS)								6257
7	Mona Steigauf (GER)								6230
8	Catherine Bond-Mills (CAN)								6206
9	Inga Mikhaylova (RUS)								6155
10	Ines Krause (GER)								6117

== See also ==
- 1994 European Championships in Athletics – Men's Decathlon
- 1994 European Championships in Athletics – Women's heptathlon
