= 1997 Hypo-Meeting =

The 23rd annual Hypo-Meeting took place on May 31 and June 1, 1997 in Götzis, Austria. The track and field competition featured a decathlon (men) and a heptathlon (women) event.

== Men's Decathlon ==
=== Schedule ===
May 31
1. 100 m
2. Long Jump
3. Shot Put
4. High Jump
5. 400 m

June 1
6. 110 m hurdles
7. Discus Throw
8. Pole Vault
9. Javelin Throw
10. 1,500 m

=== Records ===
World Record	Dan O'Brien (USA)	8891	September 5, 1992	Talence, France
Event Record	Eduard Hämäläinen (BLR)	8735	May 29, 1994	Götzis, Austria

=== Results ===
Rank	Athlete	Decathlon										Points
Rank	Athlete	1	2	3	4	5	6	7	8	9	10	Points
1	Eduard Hämäläinen (FIN)	10,76	7.54	16.56	2.00	47,09	13,79	47.64	5.20	55.18	4.44,32	8617
2	Tomáš Dvořák (CZE)	10,63	7.76	15.88	1.91	47,87	13,74	45.08	4.70	69.86	4.41,80	8560
3	Michael Smith (CAN)	11,04	7.52	17.45	2.00	48,71	14,72	50.16	4.80	70.54	4.46,60	8555
4	Erki Nool (EST)	10,50	7.90	14.63	1.94	46,53	14,41	37.56	5.30	65.18	4.41,82	8534
5	Jón Arnar Magnússon (ISL)	10,56	7.66	15.31	2.00	47,27	14,00	45.98	4.70	63.50	4.52,22	8470
6	Roman Šebrle (CZE)	10,93	7.67	14.30	2.06	48,13	14,27	42.32	4.80	65.06	4.44,35	8330
7	Lev Lobodin (RUS)	11,02	7.59	14.56	2.03	48,69	14,20	43.14	4.80	58.40	4.43,24	8184
8	Ramil Ganiyev (UZB)	10,94	7.61	13.82	2.06	49,16	14,32	41.92	4.90	51.44	4.43,95	8050
9	Philipp Huber (SUI)	10,95	7.30	14.50	1.88	48,14	14,85	42.02	4.70	58.10	4.21,64	8017
10	Michael Nolan (CAN)	10,91	7.31	14.82	1.97	49,92	14,89	47.10	4.90	54.42	4.43,28	8009
11	Andrew Fucci (USA)	10,85	7.41	12.59	1.91	49,18	14,30	42.64	5.00	60.88	4.43,97	7996
12	Zsolt Kürtösi (HUN)	10,90	7.48	14.39	2.00	49,82	14,53	45.24	4.60	56.02	4.48,61	7965
13	Sándor Munkácsi (HUN)	10,96	7.36	13.81	1.91	48,57	14,33	41.90	4.50	56.22	4.24,94	7946
14	Rojs Piziks (LAT)	11,35	7.14	14.92	2.09	51,54	15,33	39.64	4.90	63.30	4.37,00	7882
15	Kamil Damašek (CZE)	11,19	7.36	15.00	2.03	47,92	15,15	32.68	4.80	56.92	4.36,37	7845
16	Simon Poelman (NZL)	10,79	7.06	15.30	1.91	51,11	14,33	44.62	4.50	55.62	4.41,22	7827
17	Patrik Andersson (SWE)	11,16	7.37	15.57	1.94	49,77	14,48	42.02	4.80	55.44	5.03,20	7805
18	Thomas Tebbich (AUT)	10,95	7.30	14.05	1.94	50,16	15,00	40.34	4.40	62.74	4.41,66	7746
19	Klaus Ambrosch (AUT)	11,11	7.32	14.55	1.85	50,21	15,10	42.10	4.20	62.02	4.42,33	7615
20	Pierre Faber (RSA)	11,27	6.94	14.79	2.06	50,50	15,75	44.18	4.50	56.04	4.59,10	7542
21	Mirko Spada (SUI)	11,21	6.99	15.28	1.85	51,35	14,78	43.04	4.20	55.72	4.53,95	7400
22	Thomas Weiler (AUT)	10,97	7.24	12.91	2.03	50,26	15,18	36.82	4.60	40.82	4.44,85	7356
23	Ricky Barker (USA)	10,73	7.14	14.30	2.03	48,91	14,59	36.90	4.70	54.52	NM	7190
24	Hitoshi Maruono (JPN)	11,01	7.07	13.31	2.03	53,30	15,14	33.56	4.80	56.68	5.28,31	7187

== Women's Heptathlon ==
=== Schedule ===
May 31
1. 100 m hurdles
2. High Jump
3. Shot Put
4. 200 m

June 1
5. Long Jump
6. Javelin Throw
7. 800 m

=== Records ===
World Record	Jackie Joyner-Kersee (USA)	7291	September 24, 1988	Seoul, South Korea
Event Record	Sabine Braun (GER)	6985	May 31, 1992	Götzis, Austria

=== Results ===
Rank	Athlete	Heptathlon							Points
Rank	Athlete	1	2	3	4	5	6	7	Points
1	Denise Lewis (GBR)	13.32	1.82	14.33	24.10	6.77	52.30	2:16.70	6736
2	Natallia Sazanovich (BLR)	13.45	1.79	13.10	23.62	6.72	45.24	2:20.27	6442
3	Kym Carter (USA)	13.81	1.79	15.23	23.95	5.75	40.48	2:10.93	6235
4	Urszula Włodarczyk (POL)								6228
5	Tiia Hautala (FIN)								6011
6	Helena Vinarová (CZE)								5905

== See also ==
- 1997 World Championships in Athletics – Men's decathlon
- 1997 World Championships in Athletics – Women's heptathlon
