= Aric Long =

American decathlete

Personal information
- Born: April 15, 1970 (age 56) East Liverpool, Ohio, United States

Sport
- Sport: Athletics
- Event: Decathlon

Aric Solomon Long (born April 15, 1970) is an American athlete. He competed in the men's decathlon at the 1992 Summer Olympics.

Competing for the Tennessee Volunteers men's track and field team, Long won the 1991 NCAA Division I Outdoor Track and Field Championships in the decathlon.
