= Indrek Kaseorg =

Estonian decathlete

Personal information
- Nationality: Estonian
- Born: 16 December 1967 (age 58) Tartu, then part of Estonian SSR, Soviet Union
- Height: 194 cm (76 in)
- Weight: 86 kg (190 lb)

Sport
- Country: Estonia
Medal record
Representing Estonia
Summer Universiade
Silver medal – second place	1993 Buffalo	Decathlon

Indrek Kaseorg (born 16 December 1967) is a retired Estonian decathlete.

== Achievements ==
Year	Competition	Venue	Position	Event	Result
Representing Estonia
1993	World Championships	Stuttgart, Germany	12th	Decathlon	7911 pts
1993	Universiade	Buffalo, United States	2nd	Decathlon	7864 pts
1994	European Indoor Championships	Paris, France	7th	Heptathlon	5888 pts
1994	Hypo-Meeting	Götzis, Austria	18th	Decathlon	7779 pts
1994	European Championships	Helsinki, Finland	20th	Decathlon	7272 pts
1995	Hypo-Meeting	Götzis, Austria	12th	Decathlon	8041 pts
1995	Universiade	Fukuoka, Japan	5th	Decathlon	7943 pts
1995	World Championships	Gothenburg, Sweden	11th	Decathlon	8042 pts
1996	Olympic Games	Atlanta, United States	—	Decathlon	DNF
1997	World Championships	Athens, Greece	11th	Decathlon	8140 pts
1998	European Indoor Championships	Valencia, Spain	7th	Heptathlon	6055 pts
1998	Hypo-Meeting	Götzis, Austria	9th	Decathlon	8179 pts
1999	Hypo-Meeting	Götzis, Austria	10th	Decathlon	7925 pts
1999	World Championships	Seville, Spain	12th	Decathlon	7851 pts
2000	Hypo-Meeting	Götzis, Austria	16th	Decathlon	7876 pts
2000	Olympic Games	Sydney, Australia	17th	Decathlon	7932 pts

=== Personal bests ===
- Decathlon – 8179 pts (1998)
- Icosathlon – 13906 pts (1992)
- 100 metres – 11.18 s (1998)
- 400 metres – 48.35 s (1995)
- 1500 metres – 4:09.65 min (1992)
- 110 metres hurdles – 14.26 s (1995)
- High jump – 2.12 m (1991)
- Pole vault – 4.90 m (1997)
- Long jump – 7.59 m (1993)
- Shot put – 14.62 m (2001)
- Discus throw – 44.41 m (1999)
- Javelin throw – 68.37 m (2000)
