= Beniamino Poserina =

Italian decathlete

Personal information
- Nationality: Italian
- Born: 6 November 1970 (age 55) Monfalcone, Italy
- Height: 1.86 m (6 ft 1 in)
- Weight: 76 kg (168 lb)

Sport
- Country: Italy
- Sport: Athletics
- Event: Combined events
- Club: G.S. Fiamme Azzurre

Achievements and titles
- Personal bests: Decathlon: 8169 (1996); Heptathlon: 5840 (1998)
Medal record
Event	1st	2nd	3rd
Mediterranean Games	0	1	0

Beniamino Poserina (born 6 November 1970) is a retired male decathlete from Italy.

== Biography ==
He competed for his native country at the 1996 Summer Olympics in Atlanta, Georgia. A member of Fiamme Azzurre Roma he set his personal best score (8169 points) in the men's decathlon on 6 October 1996 in Formia. That mark has been national record for 26 years.

== National records ==
- Decathlon: 8169 points ( (Italy) Formia, 6 October 1996) - Current holder

== Achievements ==
Year	Competition	Venue	Position	Event	Notes
1996	Olympic Games	Atlanta, United States	30th	Decathlon	7013 pt
1997	Mediterranean Games	Bari, Italy	2nd	Decathlon	7991 pt
1997	World Championships	Athens, Greece	DNF	Decathlon	—

== National titles ==
He has won 8 times the individual national championship.

- 5 wins in the decathlon (1994, 1995, 1996, 1997, 2002)
- 3 wins in the heptathlon indoor (1996, 1998, 1999)

== See also ==
- Italian records in athletics
- Italian all-time lists - Decathlon
