= Mirko Spada =

Swiss decathlete

Personal information
- Born: 26 January 1969 (age 57) Zurich, Switzerland

Sport
- Sport: Decathlon

Mirko Spada (born 26 January 1969) is a retired male decathlete from Switzerland. He set his personal best (7984 points) in the men's decathlon on 2 July 1995 in Helmond, Netherlands. Spada is a two-time national champion in the men's decathlon: 1993 and 1994.

== Achievements ==
Year	Competition	Venue	Position	Event	Notes
Representing Switzerland
1988	World Junior Championships	Sudbury, Canada	8th	Decathlon	7018 pts
1993	Hypo-Meeting	Götzis, Austria	19th	Decathlon	7507 pts
1994	Hypo-Meeting	Götzis, Austria	13th	Decathlon	7877 pts
1994	European Championships	Helsinki, Finland	16th	Decathlon	7669 pts
1995	Hypo-Meeting	Götzis, Austria	16th	Decathlon	7950 pts
1995	World Championships	Gothenburg, Sweden	17th	Decathlon	7744 pts
1997	Hypo-Meeting	Götzis, Austria	21st	Decathlon	7400 pts
