= Dezső Szabó (athlete) =

Hungarian decathlete

Personal information
- Born: 4 September 1967 (age 59) Budapest, Hungary

Sport
- Sport: Track and field
Medal record
Representing Hungary
Summer Universiade
Gold medal – first place	1995 Fukuoka	Decathlon
Bronze medal – third place	1989 Duisburg	Decathlon
European Championships
Silver medal – second place	1990 Split	Decathlon
European Indoor Championships
Silver medal – second place	1998 Valencia	Heptathlon

Dezső Szabó (born 4 September 1967) is a retired Hungarian decathlete. His son, also named Dezső Szabó, competed in pole vault at the 2006 World Junior Championships.

== Achievements ==
Year	Competition	Venue	Position	Event	Notes
Representing Hungary
1986	World Junior Championships	Athens, Greece	8th	Decathlon	7215 pts
1988	Hypo-Meeting	Götzis, Austria	15th	Decathlon	7852 pts
1988	Olympic Games	Seoul, South Korea	13th	Decathlon	8093 pts
1989	Hypo-Meeting	Götzis, Austria	5th	Decathlon	8080 pts
1989	Universiade	Duisburg, West Germany	3rd	Decathlon	8031 pts
1990	Hypo-Meeting	Götzis, Austria	2nd	Decathlon	8306 pts
1990	European Championships	Split, Yugoslavia	2nd	Decathlon	8436 pts
1991	World Championships	Tokyo, Japan	—	Decathlon	DNF
1992	Olympic Games	Barcelona, Spain	4th	Decathlon	8199 pts
1993	World Indoor Championships	Toronto, Canada	5th	Heptathlon	5790 pts
1994	European Championships	Helsinki, Finland	8th	Decathlon	7995 pts
1995	Universiade	Fukuoka, Japan	1st	Decathlon	8051 pts
1996	Hypo-Meeting	Götzis, Austria	23rd	Decathlon	7376 pts
1998	European Indoor Championships	Valencia, Spain	2nd	Heptathlon	6249 pts
1998	European Championships	Budapest, Hungary	7th	Decathlon	8392 pts
1999	World Indoor Championships	Maebashi, Japan	7th	Heptathlon	6029 pts

== Awards ==
- Hungarian athlete of the Year (1): 1990
