= Sebastian Chmara =

Polish decathlete (born 1971)

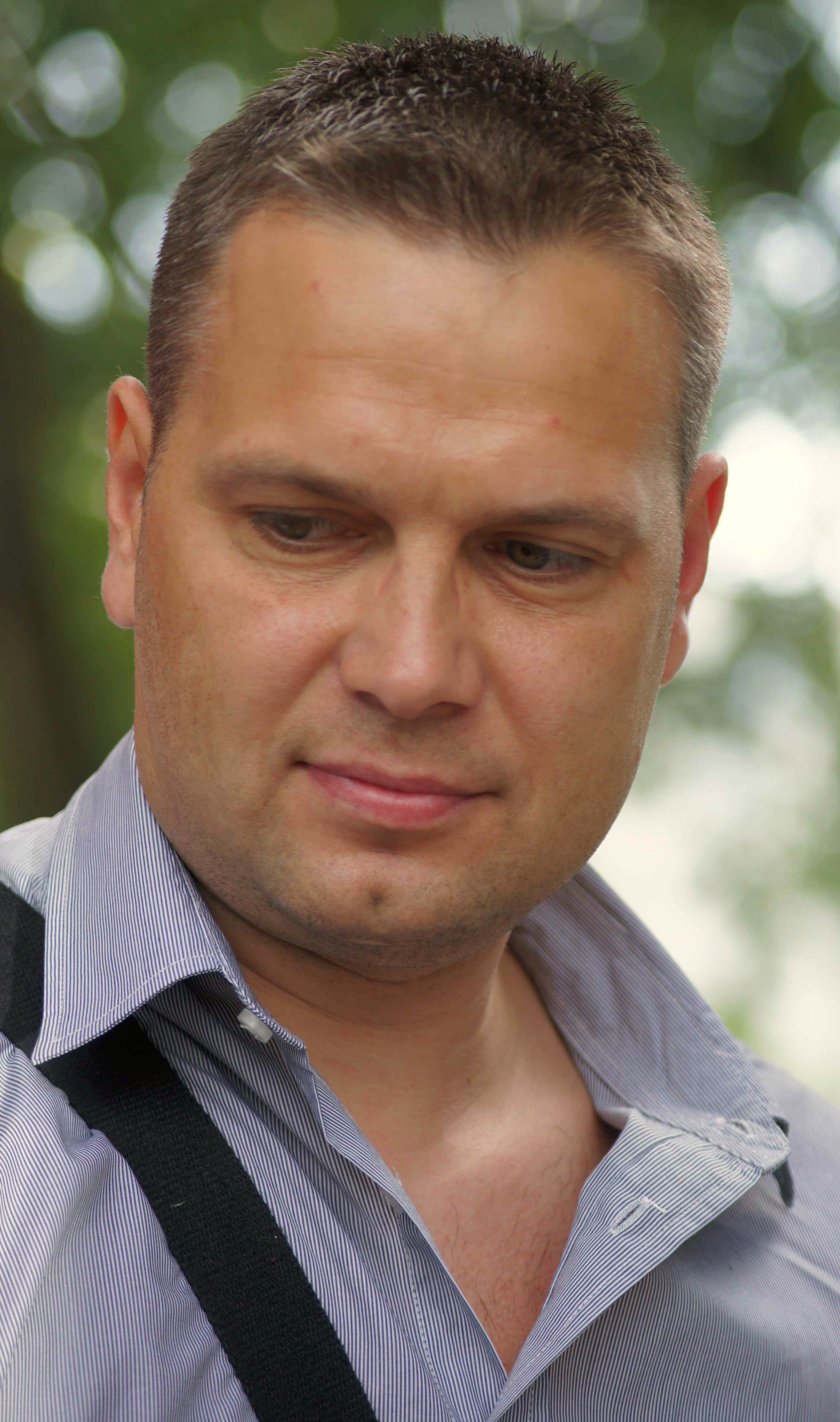
- Sebastian Chmara in 2011

Personal information
- Born: 21 November 1971 (age 54) Bydgoszcz, Poland
- Height: 1.91 m (6 ft 3 in)
- Weight: 85 kg (187 lb) (1996)

Sport
- Sport: Track and field
- Event: Decathlon / Heptathlon
- Club: Zawisza Bydgoszcz
Medal record
Men's athletics
Representing Poland
World Indoor Championships
Gold medal – first place	1999 Maebashi	Heptathlon
European Indoor Championships
Gold medal – first place	1998 Valencia	Heptathlon
Summer Universiade
Silver medal – second place	1995 Fukuoka	Decathlon

Sebastian Michał Chmara (Polish pronunciation: [sɛˈbastjan ˈmixaw ˈxmara]; born 21 November 1971) is a former decathlete from Poland who became world indoor champion in 1999 and European indoor champion in 1998 (both in heptathlon, as decathlon is unsuitable for indoor contests).

His personal bests are 8566 points in the decathlon (Alhama de Murcia 1998) and 6415 points in the indoor heptathlon (Valencia 1998). Both are standing national records.

He is a cousin of a former pole vaulter, Mirosław Chmara.

== Competition record ==
Year	Competition	Venue	Position	Event	Notes
Representing Poland
1989	European Junior Championships	Varaždin, Yugoslavia	14th	Decathlon	6880 pts
1990	World Junior Championships	Plovdiv, Bulgaria	7th	Decathlon	7211 pts
1995	World Championships	Gothenburg, Sweden	–	Decathlon	DNF
1995	Universiade	Fukuoka, Japan	2nd	Decathlon	8014 pts
1996	European Indoor Championships	Stockholm, Sweden	4th	Heptathlon	6016 pts
1996	Hypo-Meeting	Götzis, Austria	14th	Decathlon	7930 pts
1996	Olympic Games	Atlanta, United States	15th	Decathlon	8249 pts
1997	World Indoor Championships	Paris, France	–	Heptathlon	DNF
1997	World Championships	Athens, Greece	–	Decathlon	DNF
1998	European Indoor Championships	Valencia, Spain	1st	Heptathlon	6415 pts
1998	Hypo-Meeting	Götzis, Austria	6th	Decathlon	8332 pts
1998	European Championships	Budapest, Hungary	–	Decathlon	DNF
1999	World Indoor Championships	Maebashi, Japan	1st	Heptathlon	6386 pts

== Personal bests ==
Outdoor
- 100 metres – 11.04 (+1.8 m/s) (1998)
- 400 metres – 47.76 (1998)
- 1500 metres – 4:26.96 (1996)
- 110 metres hurdles – 14.25 (+1.5 m/s) (1998)
- High jump – 2.14 (2001)
- Pole vault – 5.20 (1997)
- Long jump – 7.75 (1996)
- Shot put – 16.03 (1998)
- Discus throw – 43.48 (1997)
- Javelin throw – 58.02 (2000)
- Decathlon – 8566 (1998) NR
Indoor
- 60 metres – 7.09 (1998)
- 1000 metres – 2:37.86 (1999)
- 60 metres hurdles – 7.92 (1998)
- High jump – 2.17 (1998)
- Pole vault – 5.30 (1999)
- Long jump – 7.65 (1998)
- Shot put – 15.89 (1999)
- Heptathlon – 6415 (1998) NR

== See also ==
- Polish records in athletics
