= Philipp Huber =

Swiss decathlete

Philipp Huber (born 18 February 1974) is a Swiss decathlete. His personal best result was 8153 points, achieved in June 2000 in Götzis.

== Achievements ==
Year	Competition	Venue	Position	Event	Notes
Representing Switzerland
1992	World Junior Championships	Seoul, South Korea	5th	Decathlon	7188 pts
1994	European Championships	Helsinki, Finland	14th	Decathlon	7725 pts
1995	Hypo-Meeting	Götzis, Austria	24th	Decathlon	7591 pts
1997	Hypo-Meeting	Götzis, Austria	9th	Decathlon	8017 pts
1997	World Championships	Athens, Greece	12th	Decathlon	8107 pts
1998	Hypo-Meeting	Götzis, Austria	11th	Decathlon	8051 pts
1998	European Championships	Budapest, Hungary	12th	Decathlon	8081 pts
1998	IAAF World Combined Events Challenge	several places	11th	Decathlon	24,063 pts
2000	Hypo-Meeting	Götzis, Austria	10th	Decathlon	8153 pts
2000	Olympic Games	Sydney, Australia	—	Decathlon	DNF
2004	Hypo-Meeting	Götzis, Austria	14th	Decathlon	7895 pts
