= Jón Arnar Magnússon =

Icelandic decathlete

Jón Arnar Magnússon (born 28 July 1969 in Selfoss) is a former decathlete from Iceland. He has won silver and bronze medals at world indoor championships, all in heptathlon, as decathlon is unsuitable for indoor contests. Jón is the Icelandic record holder at 110 m hurdles, long jump and decathlon and former record holder at 100 m and 200 m.

== Achievements ==
Year	Competition	Venue	Position	Event	Notes
Representing Iceland
1988	World Junior Championships	Sudbury, Canada	–	Decathlon	DNF
1989	Games of the Small States of Europe	Nicosia, Cyprus	2nd	100 m	10.92 s
1989	Games of the Small States of Europe	Nicosia, Cyprus	2nd	Long jump	7.24 m
1994	Hypo-Meeting	Götzis, Austria	12th	Decathlon	7896 pts
1994	European Championships	Helsinki, Finland	–	Decathlon	DNF
1995	World Indoor Championships	Barcelona, Spain	28th (q)	Long jump	7.32 m
1995	Hypo-Meeting	Götzis, Austria	5th	Decathlon	8237 pts
1995	World Championships	Gothenburg, Sweden	–	Decathlon	DNF
1996	European Indoor Championships	Stockholm, Sweden	3rd	Heptathlon	6069 pts
1996	Olympic Games	Atlanta, United States	12th	Decathlon	8274 pts
1997	World Indoor Championships	Paris, France	3rd	Heptathlon	6145 pts
1997	Hypo-Meeting	Götzis, Austria	5th	Decathlon	8470 pts
1997	Games of the Small States of Europe	Reykjavík, Iceland	1st	110 m H	13.91 s
1997	Games of the Small States of Europe	Reykjavík, Iceland	1st	4 × 100 m	42.06 s
1997	World Championships	Athens, Greece	–	Decathlon	DNF
1998	European Indoor Championships	Valencia, Spain	5th	Heptathlon	6170 pts
1998	Hypo-Meeting	Götzis, Austria	3rd	Decathlon	8573 pts
1998	European Championships	Budapest, Hungary	4th	Decathlon	8552 pts
1998	IAAF World Combined Events Challenge	several places	2nd	Decathlon	25,708 pts
1999	World Indoor Championships	Maebashi, Japan	5th	Heptathlon	6293 pts
1999	Games of the Small States of Europe	Schaan, Liechtenstein	2nd	110 m H	14.44 m
1999	Games of the Small States of Europe	Schaan, Liechtenstein	1st	Long jump	7.64 m
1999	Games of the Small States of Europe	Schaan, Liechtenstein	2nd	Shot put	15.70 m
1999	Hypo-Meeting	Götzis, Austria	–	Decathlon	DNF
1999	World Championships	Seville, Spain	–	Decathlon	DNF
2000	European Indoor Championships	Ghent, Belgium	–	Heptathlon	DNF
2000	Hypo-Meeting	Götzis, Austria	9th	Decathlon	8206 pts
2000	Olympic Games	Sydney, Australia	–	Decathlon	DNF
2001	World Indoor Championships	Lisbon, Portugal	2nd	Heptathlon	6233 pts
2001	Hypo-Meeting	Götzis, Austria	–	Decathlon	DNF
2001	Games of the Small States of Europe	Serravalle, San Marino	1st	110 m H	14.43 s
2001	Games of the Small States of Europe	Serravalle, San Marino	1st	Long jump	7.41 m
2001	Games of the Small States of Europe	Serravalle, San Marino	1st	Shot put	15.71 m
2001	Games of the Small States of Europe	Serravalle, San Marino	3rd	Discus throw	46.40 m
2001	World Championships	Edmonton, Canada	–	Decathlon	DNF
2002	European Indoor Championships	Vienna, Austria	4th	Heptathlon	5996 pts
2002	Hypo-Meeting	Götzis, Austria	6th	Decathlon	8104 pts
2002	European Championships	Munich, Germany	4th	Decathlon	8238 pts
2003	World Indoor Championships	Birmingham, United Kingdom	4th	Heptathlon	6185 pts
2003	Hypo-Meeting	Götzis, Austria	3rd	Decathlon	8222 pts
2003	World Championships	Paris, France	–	Decathlon	DNF
2004	World Indoor Championships	Budapest, Hungary	7th	Heptathlon	5993 pts
2004	Hypo-Meeting	Götzis, Austria	–	Decathlon	DNF
2004	Olympic Games	Athens, Greece	–	Decathlon	DNF
2005	Games of the Small States of Europe	Andorra la Vella, Andorra	2nd	110 m H	15.13 s
2005	Games of the Small States of Europe	Andorra la Vella, Andorra	3rd	4 × 100 m relay	42.90 s
2005	Games of the Small States of Europe	Andorra la Vella, Andorra	5th	4 × 400 m relay	3:23.79
2005	Games of the Small States of Europe	Andorra la Vella, Andorra	4th	Pole vault	4.60 m
2005	Games of the Small States of Europe	Andorra la Vella, Andorra	3rd	Long jump	7.30 m
2005	Games of the Small States of Europe	Andorra la Vella, Andorra	4th	Shot put	15.25 m
2005	Games of the Small States of Europe	Andorra la Vella, Andorra	4th	Javelin throw	56.96 m

== Personal bests ==
Outdoor
- 100 metres - 10.56 (1997)
- 200 metres - 21.17 (1996)
- 400 metres - 46.49 (1998)
- 1500 metres - 4:32.23 (1998)
- 110 metres hurdles - 13.91 (1997)
- Long jump - 8.00 (1994)
- High jump - 2.07 (1998)
- Pole vault - 5.20 (1998)
- Shot put - 16.61 (1998)
- Discus throw - 51.30 (1996)
- Javelin throw - 64.16 (1998)
- Decathlon - 8573 (1998)
Indoor
- 60 metres – 6.85 (1996)
- 1000 metres – 2:39.55 (1999)
- 60 metres hurdles – 7.98 (2000)
- High jump – 2.05 (2001)
- Pole vault – 5.10 (1998)
- Long jump – 7.82 (2000)
- Shot put – 16.34 (2001)
- Heptathlon – 6293 (1999)
