= Pierre-Alexandre Vial =

French decathlete (born 1975)

Personal information
- Born: 25 May 1975 (age 51)

Sport
- Sport: Decathlon
Medal record
Representing France
Mediterranean Games
Gold medal – first place	1997 Bari	Decathlon
European U23 Championships
Bronze medal – third place	1997 Turku	Decathlon

Pierre-Alexandre Vial (born 25 May 1975) is a retired French decathlete.

In 1997 he won the bronze medal at the European U23 Championships, the gold medal at the 1997 Mediterranean Games, and finished nineteenth at the 1991 World Championships. He won the gold medal at the 2001 Jeux de la Francophonie.

His personal best score was 8070 points, achieved in June 1997 at the Mediterranean Games in Bari.
