= Kamil Damašek =

Czech decathlete

Personal information
- Born: 22 September 1973 (age 53) Žatec, Czechoslovakia

Sport
- Sport: Decathlon
Medal record
Representing Czech Republic
Summer Universiade
Silver medal – second place	1997 Catania	Decathlon

Kamil Damašek (born 22 September 1973) is a Czech retired decathlete. He competed for the Czech Republic at the 1996 Summer Olympics in Atlanta, Georgia. A member of Dukla Prague he set his personal best score (8256 points) in the men's decathlon in 1996.

== Achievements ==
Year	Competition	Venue	Position	Event	Notes
Representing Czechoslovakia
1992	World Junior Championships	Seoul, South Korea	12th	Decathlon	6891 pts
1993	Summer Universiade	Buffalo, United States	6th	Decathlon	7392 pts
Representing the Czech Republic
1996	Hypo-Meeting	Götzis, Austria	11th	Decathlon	7971 points
1996	Olympic Games	Atlanta, United States	16th	Decathlon	8229 points
1997	Hypo-Meeting	Götzis, Austria	15th	Decathlon	7845 points
1997	Summer Universiade	Catania, Italy	2nd	Decathlon	8072 pts
