= Zsolt Kürtösi =

Hungarian decathlete and bobsledder

Personal information
- Born: 21 March 1971 (age 55) Kiskunfélegyháza, Hungary

Sport
- Sport: Decathlon; Bobsleigh

Zsolt István Kürtösi (born 21 March 1971) is a Hungarian decathlete and bobsledder.

== Achievements ==
| Year | Competition | Venue | Position | Event | Notes |
Representing Hungary
| 1995 | World Indoor Championships | Barcelona, Spain | 9th | Heptathlon | |
| 1996 | Hypo-Meeting | Götzis, Austria | 12th | Decathlon | |
| 1997 | Hypo-Meeting | Götzis, Austria | 12th | Decathlon | |
| 1998 | Hypo-Meeting | Götzis, Austria | 13th | Decathlon | |
| 1998 | European Championships | Budapest, Hungary | 9th | Decathlon | |
| 1998 | IAAF World Combined Events Challenge | several places | 12th | Decathlon | |
| 1999 | Hypo-Meeting | Götzis, Austria | 11th | Decathlon | |
| 1999 | IAAF World Combined Events Challenge | several places | 11th | Decathlon | |
| 2000 | Hypo-Meeting | Götzis, Austria | 13th | Decathlon | |
| 2000 | Olympic Games | Sydney, Australia | 11th | Decathlon | 8149 pts = PB |
| 2001 | Hypo-Meeting | Götzis, Austria | 7th | Decathlon | |
| 2001 | World Championships | Edmonton, Canada | 13th | Decathlon | |
| 2002 | European Indoor Championships | Vienna, Austria | 6th | Heptathlon | |
| 2002 | Hypo-Meeting | Götzis, Austria | DNF | Decathlon | |
| 2002 | European Championships | Munich, Germany | 11th | Decathlon | |
| 2003 | Hypo-Meeting | Götzis, Austria | DNF | Decathlon | |
| 2004 | Hypo-Meeting | Götzis, Austria | 17th | Decathlon | |
| 2005 | Hypo-Meeting | Götzis, Austria | DNF | Decathlon | |
