= Eduard Hämäläinen =

Finnish-Belarusian decathlete (born 1969)

Personal information
- Born: 21 January 1969 (age 57)
Medal record
Men's athletics
Representing Belarus
World Championships
Silver medal – second place	1993 Stuttgart	Decathlon
Silver medal – second place	1995 Gothenburg	Decathlon
World Indoor Championships
Bronze medal – third place	1993 Toronto	Heptathlon
Representing Finland
World Championships
Silver medal – second place	1997 Athens	Decathlon
European Championships
Silver medal – second place	1998 Budapest	Decathlon

Eduard Hämäläinen (born 21 January 1969 in Karaganda, Kazakh SSR, Soviet Union) is a retired decathlete from Finland and Belarus.

He originally competed for the Soviet Union and then Belarus after the Soviet dissolution, but changed nationality. His great-grandfather had moved from Finland to Russia before 1917 and was later deported to Kazakhstan. He was a frequent competitor in the European Athletics Championships, including the men's decathlon event in 1998. During his career he won three silver medals at World Championships.

== Achievements ==
Year	Competition	Venue	Position	Event	Notes
Representing the Soviet Union
1988	World Junior Championships	Sudbury, Canada	3rd	Decathlon	7596 pts
1991	World Championships	Tokyo, Japan	7th	Decathlon	8233 pts
Representing Unified Team
1992	Olympic Games	Barcelona, Spain	—	Decathlon	DNF
1992	Hypo-Meeting	Götzis, Austria	2nd	Decathlon	8483 pts
Representing / Belarus
1993	World Indoor Championships	Toronto, Canada	3rd	Heptathlon	6075 pts
1993	Hypo-Meeting	Götzis, Austria	1st	Decathlon	8604 pts
1993	World Championships	Stuttgart, Germany	2nd	Decathlon	8724 pts
1994	Hypo-Meeting	Götzis, Austria	1st	Decathlon	8735 pts
1994	European Championships	Helsinki, Finland	—	Decathlon	DNF
1995	Hypo-Meeting	Götzis, Austria	2nd	Decathlon	8438 pts
1995	World Championships	Gothenburg, Sweden	2nd	Decathlon	8489 pts
1996	Olympic Games	Atlanta, United States	5th	Decathlon	8613 pts
Representing Finland
1997	Hypo-Meeting	Götzis, Austria	1st	Decathlon	8617 pts
1997	World Championships	Athens, Greece	2nd	Decathlon	8730 pts
1998	European Championships	Budapest, Hungary	2nd	Decathlon	8587 pts
1998	IAAF World Combined Events Challenge	several places	6th	Decathlon	24,923 pts
2000	Olympic Games	Sydney, Australia	24th	Decathlon	7520 pts
2000	Hypo-Meeting	Götzis, Austria	—	Decathlon	DNF
2001	Hypo-Meeting	Götzis, Austria	9th	Decathlon	8028 pts
2001	World Championships	Edmonton, Canada	—	Decathlon	DNF

=== Personal bests ===
- Decathlon - 8735 (1994)
- 100 metres - 10.69 (1994)
- 400 metres - 46.71 (1997)
- 1500 metres - 4:22.0 (1987)
- 110 metres hurdles - 13.57 (1993)
- Pole vault - 5.30 (1993)
- High jump - 2.11 (1994)
- Long jump - 7.56 (1997)
- Shot put - 16.74 (1996)
- Discus throw - 52.20 (1994)
- Javelin throw - 61.88 (1993)

== See also ==
- List of nationality transfers in athletics
