= Stefan Schmid =

German decathlete

Personal information
- Born: 6 July 1970 (age 56) Würzburg, West Germany

Sport
- Sport: Track and field

Stefan Schmid (born 6 July 1970) is a German decathlete. His personal best result was 8485 points, achieved in July 2000 in Ratingen.

== Achievements ==
Year	Competition	Venue	Position	Notes
Representing Germany
1991	Hypo-Meeting	Götzis, Austria	9th	7779 pts
1994	Hypo-Meeting	Götzis, Austria	3rd	8201 pts
1994	European Championships	Helsinki, Finland	5th	8109 pts
1997	World Championships	Athens, Greece	7th	8360 pts
1998	European Championships	Budapest, Hungary	14th	8011 pts
2000	Hypo-Meeting	Götzis, Austria	8th	8445 pts
2000	Olympic Games	Sydney, Australia	9th	8206 pts
2001	World Championships	Edmonton, Canada	7th	8307 pts
