= Francisco Javier Benet =

Spanish decathlete

Personal information
- Born: 25 March 1968 (age 58) Tétouan, Morocco

Sport
- Sport: Decathlon

Francisco Javier Benet Martín (born 25 March 1968) is a Spanish decathlete.

== Achievements ==
Year	Competition	Venue	Position	Event	Notes
Representing Spain
1990	Ibero-American Championships	Manaus, Brazil	4th	Decathlon	7073 pts
1992	Olympic Games	Barcelona, Spain	22nd	Decathlon	7484 pts
1994	European Indoor Championships	Paris, France	10th	Heptathlon	5501 pts
1994	European Championships	Helsinki, Finland	12th	Decathlon	7836 pts
1996	Olympic Games	Atlanta, United States	19th	Decathlon	8107 pts
1997	World Championships	Athens, Greece	15th	Decathlon	7929 pts
1998	European Indoor Championships	Valencia, Spain	8th	Heptathlon	6044 pts
1999	World Championships	Seville, Spain	16th	Decathlon	7529 pts
