= Steve Fritz =

American decathlete (born 1967)

Personal information
- Born: November 1, 1967 (age 58) Salina, Kansas, United States

Sport
- Sport: Track and field
Medal record
Representing United States
Summer Universiade
| Gold medal – first place | 1991 Sheffield | Decathlon |

Steve Thomas Fritz (born November 1, 1967) is an American retired decathlete.

Fritz, who was born in Salina, Kansas, played basketball and competed in track and field for Kansas State University. He was an All-American and Big 12 champion decathlete in 1989 and 1990. Fritz set the Kansas State school record for points in the decathlon. Fritz represented the United States on 10 national teams for decathlon, including a first-place finish at the 1991 Summer Universiade in Sheffield, England, and a fourth-place finish at the 1996 Olympic Games in Atlanta, Georgia.

Fritz was named to the K-State Athletics Hall of Fame in 2000 and enshrined to the Kansas Sports Hall of Fame on October 4, 2020.

Fritz was an assistant coach for the Kansas State track and field team for 21 years, and is currently the assistant basketball coach at Wamego High School. He is also the track coach at Wamego High School.

== Personal life ==
His wife, Suzie Fritz, is the head coach for League One Nebraska, a professional volleyball team in Omaha, Nebraska. Prior to that, she was the head volleyball coach at Kansas State University from 2001-2022.

His son, T.J. Fritz, played basketball at Bellevue University & played basketball for Wamego High School, where he averaged 22.4 points per game in 2018 as a senior, which led Kansas Class 4A. Fritz then reclassified from the class of 2019 to the class of 2020 and enrolled at Sunrise Christian Academy in Bel Aire, KS, considered one of the best basketball high schools in the world, to play for their postgraduate team. After his season at Sunrise, Fritz committed to the University of Nebraska-Kearney on April 15, 2020.

Fritz also has a son, Jake who is a student at Kansas State University.

== Achievements ==
| Year | Competition | Venue | Position | Notes |
Representing the United States
| 1991 | Universiade | Sheffield, England | 1st | Decathlon |
| 1993 | World Championships | Stuttgart, Germany | 7th | Decathlon |
| 1994 | Goodwill Games | St. Petersburg, Russia | 2nd | Decathlon |
| 1996 | Olympic Games | Atlanta, United States | 4th | Decathlon |
| 1997 | World Indoor Championships | Paris, France | 6th | Heptathlon |
| 1997 | World Championships | Athens, Greece | 4th | Decathlon |
