= 1999 in the decathlon =

This page lists the World Best Year Performance in the year 1999 in the men's decathlon. The main event during this season were the 1999 World Athletics Championships in Seville, Spain, where the competition started on Tuesday August 24, 1999, and ended on Wednesday August 25, 1999. Tomáš Dvořák broke the world record, collecting 8994 points at a meet in Prague, Czech Republic.

== Records ==
Standing records prior to the 1999 season in track and field
World Record	Dan O'Brien (USA)	8891	September 5, 1992	Talence, France
Broken records during the 1999 season in track and field
World Record	Tomáš Dvořák (CZE)	8994	July 4, 1999	Prague, Czech Republic

== 1999 World Year Ranking ==
Rank	Points	Athlete	Venue	Date	Note
1	8790	Tomáš Dvořák (CZE)	Prague, Czech Republic	04/07/1999	WR
2	8664	Erki Nool (EST)	Talence, France	19/09/1999	
3	8556	Dean Macey (GBR)	Seville, Spain	25/08/1999	
4	8547	Chris Huffins (USA)	Seville, Spain	25/08/1999	
5	8527	Roman Šebrle (CZE)	Prague, Czech Republic	04/07/1999	
6	8524	Sébastien Levicq (FRA)	Seville, Spain	25/08/1999	
7	8494	Lev Lobodin (RUS)	Seville, Spain	25/08/1999	
8	8463	Tom Pappas (USA)	Tucson, United States	18/03/1999	
9	8414	Frank Busemann (GER)	Ratingen, Germany	18/07/1999	
10	8379	Attila Zsivoczky (HUN)	Göteborg, Sweden	30/07/1999	
11	8363	Chiel Warners (NED)	Götzis, Austria	30/05/1999	
12	8357	Francisco Javier Benet (ESP)	Castellón, Spain	06/06/1999	
13	8312	Wilfrid Boulineau (FRA)	Arles, France	30/05/1999	PB
14	8274	Klaus Isekenmeier (GER)	Götzis, Austria	30/05/1999	
15	8264	Mike Maczey (GER)	Aachen, Germany	08/08/1999	
16	8215	Oleksandr Yurkov (UKR)	Desenzano del Garda, Italia	09/05/1999	
17	8160	Benjamin Jensen (NOR)	Greve, Denmark	01/08/1999	
18	8150	Henrik Dagård (SWE)	Seville, Spain	25/08/1999	
19	8130	Dan Steele (USA)	Seville, Spain	25/08/1999	
20	8108	Raúl Duany (CUB)	Santiago de Cuba, Cuba	27/02/1999	
21	8107	David Mewes (GER)	Ratingen, Germany	18/07/1999	
22	8085	Trond Høiby (NOR)	Herentals, Belgium	04/07/1999	
23	8059	Indrek Kaseorg (EST)	Talence, France	19/09/1999	
24	8056	Scott Ferrier (AUS)	Hobart, Australia	28/02/1999	
25	8045	Chad Smith (USA)	Azusa, United States	16/04/1999	
26	8039	Thomas Tebbich (AUT)	Götzis, Austria	30/05/1999	
27	8037	Stephen Moore (USA)	Aachen, Germany	08/08/1999	
28	8025	Prodromos Korkizoglou (GRE)	Thessaloniki, Greece	30/05/1999	
29	8017	Kip Janvrin (USA)	Aachen, Germany	08/08/1999	
30	8015	Jirí Ryba (CZE)	Desenzano del Garda, Italia	09/05/1999	
31	8000	Philip Ibe (GER)	Aachen, Germany	08/08/1999	
32	7999	Florian Schönbeck (GER)	Prague, Czech Republic	04/07/1999	
33	7992	Volodymyr Mykhailenko (UKR)	Odesa, Ukraine	21/05/1999	
34	7981	Stefan Schmid (GER)	Lage, Germany	05/09/1999	
35	7971	Cédric Lopez (FRA)	Niort, France	31/07/1999	
36	7966	Volodymyr Shatkovskiyy (UKR)	Odesa, Ukraine	21/05/1999	
37	7960	Eugenio Balanqué (CUB)	Santiago de Cuba, Cuba	27/02/1999	
38	7942	Lionel Marceny (FRA)	Arles, France	30/05/1999	
39	7937	Laurent Hernu (FRA)	Talence, France	19/09/1999	
40	7937	Mário Aníbal (POR)	Arles, France	30/05/1999	
41	7908	Boris Kawohl (GER)	Bernhausen, Germany	20/06/1999	
42	7905	David Pope (USA)	Azusa, United States	16/04/1999	
43	7901	Zsolt Kürtösi (HUN)	Palma de Mallorca, Spain	12/07/1999	
44	7899	Pierre-Alexandre Vial (FRA)	Arles, France	30/05/1999	
45	7882	Jörg Goedicke (GER)	Prague, Czech Republic	04/07/1999	
46	7881	Aki Heikkinen (FIN)	Riga, Latvia	06/08/1999	
47	7873	Matthew Zuber (USA)	Azusa, United States	16/04/1999	
48	7872	Michael Hoffer (SWE)	Alhama de Murcia, Spain	23/05/1999	
49	7872	Rick Wassenaar (NED)	Ratingen, Germany	18/07/1999	
50	7863	Antonio Peñalver (ESP)	Castellón, Spain	06/06/1999	

== See also ==
- 1999 Hypo-Meeting
