= 1998 in the decathlon =

This page lists the World Best Year Performance in the year 1998 in the men's decathlon. One of the main events during this season were the 1998 European Championships in Budapest, Hungary, where the competition started on August 18, 1998, and ended on August 19, 1998.

== Records ==
Standing records prior to the 1998 season in track and field
World Record	Dan O'Brien (USA)	8891	September 5, 1992	Talence, France

== 1998 World Year Ranking ==
Rank	Points	Athlete	Venue	Date	Note
1	8755	Dan O'Brien (USA)	Uniondale, United States	20/07/1998	
2	8694	Chris Huffins (USA)	New Orleans, United States	20/06/1998	PB
3	8672	Erki Nool (EST)	Götzis, Austria	31/05/1998	
4	8592	Tomáš Dvořák (CZE)	Götzis, Austria	31/05/1998	
5	8589	Roman Šebrle (CZE)	Tallinn, Estonia	05/07/1998	
6	8587	Eduard Hämäläinen (FIN)	Budapest, Hungary	20/08/1998	
7	8573	Jón Arnar Magnússon (ISL)	Götzis, Austria	31/05/1998	NR
8	8571	Lev Lobodin (RUS)	Budapest, Hungary	20/08/1998	NR
9	8566	Sebastian Chmara (POL)	Alhama de Murcia, Spain	17/05/1998	NR
10	8526	Francisco Javier Benet (ESP)	Alhama de Murcia, Spain	17/05/1998	PB
11	8490	Jagan Hames (AUS)	Kuala Lumpur, Malaysia	18/09/1998	NR
12	8392	Dezső Szabó (HUN)	Budapest, Hungary	20/08/1998	
13	8307	Scott Ferrier (AUS)	Kuala Lumpur, Malaysia	18/09/1998	PB
14	8236	Klaus Isekenmeier (GER)	Ratingen, Germany	21/06/1998	
15	8231	Frank Busemann (GER)	Ratingen, Germany	21/06/1998	
16	8228	Mike Smith (CAN)	Götzis, Austria	31/05/1998	
17	8214	Sébastien Levicq (FRA)	Götzis, Austria	31/05/1998	PB
18	8183	Ricky Barker (USA)	New Orleans, United States	20/06/1998	
19	8179	Indrek Kaseorg (EST)	Götzis, Austria	31/05/1998	PB
20	8177	Jack Rosendaal (NED)	Emmeloord, Netherlands	17/05/1998	
21	8174	Mike Maczey (GER)	Budapest, Hungary	20/08/1998	
22	8140	Zsolt Kürtösi (HUN)	Budapest, Hungary	20/08/1998	
23	8128	Trafton Rodgers (USA)	Lubbock, United States	09/08/1998	PB
24	8123	Brian Brophy (USA)	New Orleans, United States	20/06/1998	
25	8118	Raúl Duany (CUB)	Maracaibo, Venezuela	16/08/1998	
26	8114	Wilfrid Boulineau (FRA)	Tallinn, Estonia	05/07/1998	
27	8103	Attila Zsivoczky (HUN)	Tallinn, Estonia	05/07/1998	
28	8090	Eugenio Balanqué (CUB)	Maracaibo, Venezuela	16/08/1998	
29	8081	Kip Janvrin (USA)	New Orleans, United States	20/06/1998	
30	8081	Philipp Huber (SUI)	Budapest, Hungary	20/08/1998	
31	8058	Ramil Ganiyev (UZB)	Alhama de Murcia, Spain	17/05/1998	
32	8034	Oleksandr Yurkov (UKR)	Desenzano del Garda, Italy	17/05/1998	
33	8011	Stefan Schmid (GER)	Budapest, Hungary	20/08/1998	
34	8007	Doug Pirini (NZL)	Kuala Lumpur, Malaysia	18/09/1998	
35	8000	Marcel Dost (NED)	Alhama de Murcia, Spain	17/05/1998	
36	7995	Bart Bennema (NED)	Götzis, Austria	31/05/1998	PB
37	7981	Nikolay Afanasyev (RUS)	Krasnodar, Russia	20/05/1998	
38	7979	Chiel Warners (NED)	Emmeloord, Netherlands	24/05/1998	
39	7947	Phillip McMullen (USA)	New Orleans, United States	20/06/1998	
40	7946	Rolf Schläfli (SUI)	Ibach, Switzerland	30/08/1998	
41	7930	Henrik Dagård (SWE)	Budapest, Hungary	20/08/1998	
42	7918	Dirk-Achim Pajonk (GER)	Lubbock, Germany	09/08/1998	
43	7890	David Mewes (GER)	Vaterstetten, Germany	30/08/1998	
44	7885	Jirí Ryba (CZE)	Götzis, Austria	31/05/1998	
45	7882	Antonio Peñalver (ESP)	Cartagena, Spain	19/07/1998	
46	7872	Christian Savoia (GER)	Ratingen, Germany	21/06/1998	PB
47	7872	Pierre Salamand (FRA)	Tallinn, Estonia	05/07/1998	PB
48	7868	Rick Wassenaar (NED)	Jona, Switzerland	26/07/1998	
49	7859	Peter Banks (AUS)	Kuala Lumpur, Malaysia	18/09/1998	
50	7858	Chad Smith (USA)	Lynchburg, United States	12/05/1998	

== See also ==
- 1998 Hypo-Meeting
