= Athletics at the 2000 Summer Olympics – Men's decathlon =

Men's decathlon at the Games of the XXVII Olympiad
- Pictogram of athletics
- Venues: Stadium Australia
- Dates: 27–28 September
- Competitors: 36 from 23 nations
- Winning result: 8641

Medalists
1st place, gold medalist(s)		Erki Nool; Estonia
2nd place, silver medalist(s)		Roman Šebrle; Czech Republic
3rd place, bronze medalist(s)		Chris Huffins; United States

Video on YouTube Official Video Highlights 18 minute feature on the decathlon

The Men's Decathlon at the 2000 Summer Olympics as part of the athletics program was held at the Stadium Australia on Wednesday 27 September and Thursday 28 September 2000.

The winning margin was 36 points. As of 2023, this is the narrowest winning margin in the Olympic decathlon since the introduction of the 1984 scoring tables and the only time the Olympic decathlon has been won by fewer than 50 points over this same period.

After the first day of the contest, Chris Huffins found himself in an eight-point lead ahead of Dean Macey. Erki Nool and Tom Pappas occupied the next places. On the next day, Nool dropped to fifth place after the 110 metres hurdles but advanced again after the controversial discus contest. Starting with two foul attempts, Nool was originally fouled in his third and last attempt as well, which would have resulted in him getting 0 points and falling out of the leading group. However, Nool successfully appealed the ring-foul ruling and had his throw measured to 43.66 metres which saw him climb one place. The British delegation, representing Macey, protested to no avail.

Following Nool's strong result in the javelin throw event Huffins' lead had shrunk to only 14 points before the 1500 metres. As this was a weak event for Huffins he looked set to lose out in the medal chase; however, he managed to lower his personal best time by twelve seconds and grasped a bronze medal. Reigning world champion and world record holder Tomáš Dvořák struggled with a knee problem throughout the competition and finished in a disappointing sixth place.

== Medalists ==
Gold	Erki Nool; Estonia
Silver	Roman Šebrle; Czech Republic
Bronze	Chris Huffins; United States

Šebrle would go on to break the world record in 2001 and win the gold medal at the 2004 Olympic Games in a new Olympic record. Huffins retired from international athletics after the end of the season.

== Records ==
These were the standing world and Olympic records (in points) prior to the 2000 Summer Olympics.

World Record	8994	Tomáš Dvořák	Czech Republic	Prague, Czech Republic	4 July 1999
Olympic Record	8847	Daley Thompson	United Kingdom	Los Angeles, United States	9 August 1984

== Results ==
=== Overall results ===
The best marks for each event were split between eight competitors with the gold medallist claiming none (which is unusual in an Olympic decathlon) but placing second in three of them.

Flying points table after final event:

Rank	Athlete	Nation	Overall points	Overview by event (points on top, then result. Best performance in each event shown in bold green with a yellow background)									
Rank	Athlete	Nation	Overall points	100 m	Long jump	Shot put	High jump	400 m	110 metres hurdles	Discus throw	Pole vault	Javelin throw	1500 m
1st place, gold medalist(s)	Erki Nool	Estonia	8641	933; 10.68	1000; 7.76	796; 15.11	803; 2.00	973; 46.71	913; 14.48	739; 43.66	910; 5.00	826; 65.82	748; 4:29.48
2nd place, silver medalist(s)	Roman Šebrle	Czech Republic	8606	878; 10.92	965; 7.62	803; 15.22	915; 2.12	899; 48.20	**991**; **13.87**	754; 44.39	849; 4.80	799; 64.04	753; 4:28.79
3rd place, bronze medalist(s)	Chris Huffins	United States	8595 (SB)	**980**; **10.48**	987; 7.71	806; 15.27	887; 2.09	894; 48.31	986; 13.91	**861**; **49.55**	819; 4.70	687; 56.62	688; 4:38.71
4	Dean Macey	Great Britain	8567 (PB)	903; 10.81	**1002**; **7.77**	766; 14.62	887; 2.09	**988**; **46.41**	907; 14.53	733; 43.37	849; 4.80	744; 60.38	788; 4:23.45
5	Tom Pappas	United States	8425	901; 10.82	913; 7.41	782; 14.87	**1002**; **2.21**	878; 48.64	955; 14.15	693; 41.42	880; 4.90	772; 62.26	649; 4:45.10
6	Tomáš Dvořák	Czech Republic	8385	881; 10.91	935; 7.50	**846**; **15.91**	776; 1.97	856; 49.11	931; 14.34	811; 47.15	731; 4.40	**888**; **69.94**	730; 4:32.23
7	Frank Busemann	Germany	8351	881; 10.91	970; 7.64	760; 14.52	887; 2.09	863; 48.97	954; 14.16	538; 33.71	910; 5.00	812; 64.91	776; 4:25.32
8	Attila Zsivoczky	Hungary	8277	838; 11.10	821; 7.00	787; 14.96	859; 2.06	880; 48.61	817; 15.27	817; 47.43	849; 4.80	827; 65.87	789; 4:23.37
9	Stefan Schmid	Germany	8206	874; 10.94	854; 7.17	731; 14.04	803; 2.00	880; 48.61	926; 14.38	681; 40.81	910; 5.00	844; 67.03	703; 4:36.49
10	Henrik Dagård	Sweden	8178 (SB)	897; 10.84	833; 7.08	788; 14.97	749; 1.94	873; 48.75	936; 14.30	725; 42.95	**941**; **5.10**	814; 65.05	622; 4:49.51
11	Zsolt Kürtösi	Hungary	8149 (PB)	861; 11.00	859; 7.19	798; 15.13	803; 2.00	870; 48.81	955; 14.15	800; 46.62	849; 4.80	695; 57.16	659; 4:43.39
12	Mário Aníbal	Portugal	8136 (NR)	867; 10.97	790; 6.90	814; 15.39	831; 2.03	875; 48.71	885; 14.71	767; 45.01	880; 4.90	700; 57.51	727; 4:32.68
13	Lev Lobodin	Russia	8071	917; 10.75	857; 7.18	836; 15.75	749; 1.94	867; 48.87	972; 14.02	758; 44.55	910; 5.00	591; 50.16	614; 4:50.73
14	Jiří Ryba	Czech Republic	8056	830; 11.14	838; 7.10	741; 14.21	803; 2.00	863; 48.97	851; 14.99	722; 42.83	880; 4.90	704; 57.76	824; 4:18.21
15	Raúl Duany	Cuba	8054	841; 11.09	893; 7.33	688; 13.34	859; 2.06	827; 49.73	918; 14.44	688; 41.17	790; 4.60	803; 64.31	747; 4:29.68
16	Oleksandr Yurkov	Ukraine	7993	885; 10.89	739; 6.68	776; 14.78	776; 1.97	877; 48.66	847; 15.02	843; 48.67	910; 5.00	659; 54.77	681; 4:39.94
17	Indrek Kaseorg	Estonia	7932	793; 11.31	866; 7.22	683; 13.26	776; 1.97	813; 50.03	902; 14.57	705; 41.98	849; 4.80	837; 66.54	708; 4:35.64
18	Klaus Ambrosch	Austria	7917	858; 11.01	854; 7.17	808; 15.30	723; 1.91	804; 50.23	859; 14.92	689; 41.22	790; 4.60	858; 67.94	674; 4:40.94
19	Laurent Hernu	France	7909	819; 11.19	847; 7.14	700; 13.54	859; 2.06	786; 50.63	910; 14.51	701; 41.78	910; 5.00	683; 56.34	694; 4:37.82
20	Wilfrid Boulineau	France	7821	845; 11.07	833; 7.08	690; 13.38	831; 2.03	823; 49.82	847; 15.02	662; 39.86	849; 4.80	733; 59.69	708; 4:35.59
21	Kip Janvrin	United States	7726	804; 11.26	727; 6.63	702; 13.57	670; 1.85	856; 49.12	831; 15.15	709; 42.20	910; 5.00	690; 56.84	**827**; **4:17.81**
22	Volodymyr Mykhailenko	Ukraine	7676	838; 11.10	823; 7.04	700; 13.53	859; 2.06	871; 48.80	869; 14.84	674; 40.45	790; 4.60	548; 47.27	704; 4:36.23
23	Fedor Laukhin	Ukraine	7652	814; 11.21	816; 7.01	677; 13.16	831; 2.03	831; 49.64	830; 15.16	631; 38.33	880; 4.90	671; 55.53	671; 4:41.48
24	Eduard Hämäläinen	Finland	7520	858; 11.01	859; 7.19	732; 14.06	670; 1.85	902; 48.14	927; 14.37	583; 35.98	849; 4.80	546; 47.11	594; 4:54.18
25	Mike Maczey	Germany	7228	823; 11.17	838; 7.10	719; 13.84	831; 2.03	819; 49.91	0 DNF	739; 43.64	**941**; **5.10**	760; 61.49	758; 4:27.99
	Eugenio Balanqué	Cuba	DNF	890; 10.87	628; 6.19	784; 14.90	749; 1.94	898; 48.23	929; 14.36	799; 46.56	0 NM		
	Claston Bernard	Jamaica	DNF	908; 10.79	0 NM	709; 13.68	887; 2.09	825; 49.77	848; 15.01	688; 41.15	0 NM		
	Prodromos Korkizoglou	Greece	DNF	919; 10.74	852; 7.16	710; 13.70	776; 1.97	657; 53.57					
	Scott Ferrier	Australia	DNF	836; 11.11	859; 7.19	698; 13.50	776; 1.97						
	Roman Razbeyko	Russia	DNF	763; 11.45	771; 6.82	727; 13.98	776; 1.97						
	Yeorgios Andreou	Cyprus	DNF	867; 10.97	750; 6.73	743; 14.24							
	Sébastien Levicq	France	DNF	757; 11.48	713; 6.57	700; 13.53							
	Trond Høiby	Norway	DNF	740; 11.56	635; 6.22	730; 14.03							
	Jón Arnar Magnússon	Iceland	DNF	894; 10.85	0 NM	819; 15.48							
	Aki Heikkinen	Finland	DNF	827; 11.15	0 NM	690; 13.37							
	Francisco Javier Benet	Spain	DNF	769; 11.42	657; 6.32								
	Philipp Huber	Switzerland	DNF	784; 11.35									
	Oleg Veretelnikov	Uzbekistan	DNF	618; 12.17									
**WR** world record | **AR** area record | **CR** championship record | **GR** games record | **NR** national record | **OR** Olympic record | **PB** personal best | **SB** season best | **WL** world leading (in a given season)
**DNF** = did not finish | **DNS** = did not start | **DQ** = disqualification | **NM** = no mark (i.e. no valid result) | **Q** = qualification by place in heat | **q** = qualification by overall place

== See also ==
- 1998 Men's European Championships Decathlon
- 1999 Men's World Championships Decathlon
- 2000 Decathlon Year Ranking
- 2001 Men's World Championships Decathlon

== Sources ==
- IAAF results day one: 100 m, long jump, shot put, high jump and 400 m. Retrieved 27 January 2007.
- IAAF results day two: 110 m hurdles, discus, pole vault, javelin and 1500 m. Retrieved 27 January 2007.
- IAAF results: Final standings. Retrieved 27 January 2007.
- IAAF (27 September 2000). "Decathlon – Day 1 (event report)". IAAF 2000 Olympic coverage. Archived from the original on 27 May 2002.
- IAAF (28 September 2000). "Decathlon – Day 2 (event report)". IAAF 2000 Olympic coverage. Archived from the original on 8 July 2003.
