= Mehrkampf-Meeting Ratingen =

- Date: May
- Location: Ratingen, Germany
- Event type: Combined events
- Established: 1997
- Website: Mehrkampf-Meeting Ratingen

The Stadtwerke Ratingen Mehrkampf-Meeting is an annual track and field meeting for decathlon and heptathlon held in Ratingen, Germany. Established in 1997, it is part of the World Athletics Combined Events Tour and takes place in May.

== Records ==
Event	Athlete	Record	Date	Ref.
Men's decathlon	Roman Šebrle (CZE)	8701 points	2002	
100 m	Rico Freimuth (GER)	10.40 (+1.1 m/s)	28 June 2014	
Long jump	Simon Ehammer (SUI)	8.30 m (+1.5 m/s)	7 May 2022	
Shot put	Leo Neugebauer (GER)	16.95 m	27 June 2026	
High jump	Rene Stauss (GER)	2.15 m	15 June 2013	
400 m	Harrison Williams (USA)	46.74	27 June 2026	
110 m hurdles	Frank Busemann (GER)	13.49	1 June 1997	
Discus throw	Leo Neugebauer (GER)	53.32 m	27 June 2026	
Pole vault	Dennis Leyckes (GER)	5.45 m	25 June 2006	
Javelin throw	Arthur Abele (GER)	71.89 m	26 June 2016	
1500 m	Niklas Kaul (GER)	4:14.19	18 June 2023	
Women's heptathlon	Annik Kälin (SUI)	6819 pts	27–28 June 2026	
100 m hurdles	Annik Kälin (SUI)	12.60 (+0.4 m/s)	27 June 2026	
High jump	Tia Hellebaut (BEL)	1.93 m	31 May 2004	
Shot put	Sara Gambetta (GER)	16.17 m	15 June 2013	
200 m	Annik Kälin (SUI)	23.00 (+0.2 m/s)	27 June 2026	
Long jump	Claudia Tonn (GER)	6.75 m	25 June 2006	
Long jump	Annik Kälin (SUI)	6.75 m (+0.2 m/s)	28 June 2026	
Javelin throw	Marie Dehning (GER)	56.12 m	23 June 2024	
800 m	Irina Belova (RUS)	2:03.01	17 June 2001	

== Results ==
Key: Meet record

=== Men ===
Year	Gold		Silver		Bronze	
1997	Frank Busemann (GER)	8556	Klaus Isekenmeier (GER)	8310	Stefan Schmid (GER)	8279
1998	Klaus Isekenmeier (GER)	8236	Frank Busemann (GER)	8231	David Mewes (GER)	8114
1999	Frank Busemann (GER)	8414	Klaus Isekenmeier (GER)	8222	David Mewes (GER)	8107
2000	Stefan Schmid (GER)	8485	Mike Maczey (GER)	8004	Klaus Isekenmeier (GER)	8002
2001	Stefan Schmid (GER)	8287	Frank Busemann (GER)	8192	Sebastian Knabe (GER)	8151
2002	Roman Šebrle (CZE)	8701	Lev Lobodin (RUS)	8433	Jón Arnar Magnússon (ISL)	8390
2003	Roman Šebrle (CZE)	8606	Jón Arnar Magnússon (ISL)	8023	Sebastian Knabe (GER)	7600
2004	Dennis Leyckes (GER)	8172	Florian Schönbeck (GER)	8044	Stefan Drews (GER)	8032
2005	André Niklaus (GER)	8193	Lars Albert (GER)	7556	Kenny Beele (GER)	7285
2006	Dmitriy Karpov (KAZ)	8414	Maurice Smith (JAM)	8349	Dennis Leyckes (GER)	8310
2007	Arthur Abele (GER)	8269	Norman Müller (GER)	8244	Jacob Minah (GER)	7998
2008	Leonel Suárez (CUB)	8451	Arthur Abele (GER)	8372	André Niklaus (GER)	8273
2009	Yordani García (CUB)	8348	Norman Müller (GER)	8295	Stefan Drews (GER)	7858
2010	Yordani García (CUB)	8288	Leonel Suárez (CUB)	8243	Dominik Distelberger (AUT)	7713
2011	Larbi Bouraada (ALG)	8302 (AR)	Rico Freimuth (GER)	8287	Pascal Behrenbruch (GER)	8232
2012	Larbi Bouraada (ALG)	8332 (AR)	Jan Felix Knobel (GER)	8228	Yordanis García (CUB)	8005
2013	Pascal Behrenbruch (GER)	8514	Rico Freimuth (GER)	8488	Jan Felix Knobel (GER)	8396
2014	Rico Freimuth (GER)	8356	Kévin Mayer (FRA)	8323	Arthur Abele (GER)	8139
2015	Michael Schrader (GER)	8419	Willem Coertzen (RSA)	8341	Pascal Behrenbruch (GER)	7826
2016	Arthur Abele (GER)	8605	Kai Kazmirek (GER)	8323	Pelle Rietveld (NED)	7659
2017	Rico Freimuth (GER)	8663	Kurt Felix (GER)	8509	Kai Kazmirek (GER)	8478
2018	Arthur Abele (GER)	8481	Manuel Eitel (GER)	8121	Marcus Nilsson (SWE)	8120
2019	Kai Kazmirek (GER)	8444	Basile Rolnin (FRA)	8205	Fredriech Pretorius (RSA)	7872
2020	Not held due to COVID-19 pandemic in Germany					
2021	Kai Kazmirek (GER)	8184	Mathias Brugger (GER)	8080	Andreas Bechmann (GER)	7955
2022	Simon Ehammer (SUI)	8354	Tim Nowak (GER)	8160	Nico Beckers (GER)	7940
2023	Niklas Kaul (GER)	8484	Jorge Ureña (ESP)	8381	Rik Taam (NED)	8326
2024	Till Steinforth (GER)	8287	Felix Wolter (GER)	8226	Vilem Strasky (CZE)	7986
2025	Not held due to calendar planning					
2026	Leo Neugebauer (GER)	8573	Makenson Gletty (FRA)	8458	Devon Williams (USA)	8402

=== Women ===
Year	Gold		Silver		Bronze	
1997	Sabine Braun (GER)	6787	Mona Steigauf (GER)	6397	Peggy Beer (GER)	6349
1998	Sabine Braun (GER)	6381	Peggy Beer (GER)	6362	Karin Specht (GER)	6278
1999	Sabine Braun (GER)	6352	Karin Ertl (GER)	6166	Urszula Włodarczyk (POL)	5985
2000	Astrid Retzke (GER)	6379	Sabine Braun (GER)	6332	Karin Ertl (GER)	6276
2001	Natalya Roshchupkina (RUS)	6433	Karin Ertl (GER)	6365	Irina Belova (RUS)	6315
2002	Sabine Braun (GER)	6254	Sonja Kesselschläger (GER)	6205	Naide Gomes (POR)	6160
2003	Sonja Kesselschläger (GER)	6296	Jane Jamieson (AUS)	6206	Katja Keller (GER)	6193
2004	Kylie Wheeler (AUS)	6296	Karin Ruckstuhl (NED)	6206	Sonja Kesselschläger (GER)	6193
2005	Kylie Wheeler (AUS)	6231	Karin Ertl (GER)	6163	Claudia Tonn (GER)	6054
2006	Lyudmila Blonska (UKR)	6427	Lilli Schwarzkopf (GER)	6413	Claudia Tonn (GER)	6373
2007	Lilli Schwarzkopf (GER)	6343	Jennifer Oeser (GER)	6250	Sonja Kesselschläger (GER)	6184
2008	Lilli Schwarzkopf (GER)	6536	Jennifer Oeser (GER)	6436	Sonja Kesselschläger (GER)	6311
2009	Jennifer Oeser (GER)	6442	Tatyana Chernova (RUS)	6386	Lilli Schwarzkopf (GER)	6355
2010	Jennifer Oeser (GER)	6427	Lilli Schwarzkopf (GER)	6386	Maren Schwerdtner (GER)	6045
2011	Jennifer Oeser (GER)	6663	Aiga Grabuste (LAT)	6507	Lilli Schwarzkopf (GER)	6370
2012	Julia Mächtig (GER)	6341	Maren Schwerdtner (GER)	6000	Ellen Sprunger (SUI)	5989
2013	Julia Mächtig (GER)	6430	Claudia Rath (GER)	6317	Kira Biesenbach (GER)	6185
2014	Lilli Schwarzkopf (GER)	6426	Claudia Rath (GER)	6314	Karolina Tymińska (POL)	6266
2015	Anouk Vetter (NED)	6387	Jennifer Oeser (GER)	6306	Claudia Rath (GER)	6290
2016	Jessica Ennis-Hill (GBR)	6733	Carolin Schäfer (GER)	6476	Jennifer Oeser (GER)	6058
2017	Carolin Schäfer (GER)	6667	Nadine Visser (NED)	6183	Mareike Arndt (GER)	6106
2018	Carolin Schäfer (GER)	6549	Ivona Dadic (AUT)	6413	Mareike Arndt (GER)	6169
2020	Not held due to COVID-19 pandemic in Germany					
2019	Verena Preiner (AUT)	6591	Ivona Dadic (AUT)	6461	Nadine Broersen (NED)	6232
2021	Georgia Ellenwood (CAN)	6314	Odile Ahouanwanou (BEN)	6274	Verena Mayr (AUT)	6254
2022	Sophie Weißenberg (GER)	6273	Carolin Schäfer (GER)	6170	Léonie Cambours (FRA)	5933
2023	Carolin Schäfer (GER)	6369	Sophie Weißenberg (GER)	6247	Emma Oosterwegel (NED)	6209
2024	Sandrina Sprengel (GER)	6260	Kate O'Connor (IRL)	6244	Tori West (AUS)	6235
2025	Not held due to calendar planning					
2026	Annik Kälin (SUI)	6819	Erin Marsh (USA)	6305	Sandrina Sprengel (GER)	6218
