= 1996 Hypo-Meeting =

The 22nd edition of the annual Hypo-Meeting took place on May 25 and May 26, 1996 in Götzis, Austria. The track and field competition featured a men's decathlon and a women's heptathlon. It was the last big test before the start of the 1996 Summer Olympics in Atlanta, Georgia.

== Men's decathlon ==
=== Schedule ===
May 25
1. 100 m
2. Long Jump
3. Shot Put
4. High Jump
5. 400 m

May 26
6. 110 m hurdles
7. Discus Throw
8. Pole Vault
9. Javelin Throw
10. 1,500 m

=== Records ===
World Record	Dan O'Brien (USA)	8891	September 5, 1992	Talence, France
Event Record	Eduard Hämäläinen (BLR)	8735	May 29, 1994	Götzis, Austria

=== Results ===
Rank	Athlete	Decathlon										Points
Rank	Athlete	1	2	3	4	5	6	7	8	9	10	Points
1	Michael Smith (CAN)	11,23	7.72	16.94	1.97	48,69	14,77	52.90	4.90	71.22	4.41,95	8626
2	Tomáš Dvořák (CZE)	10,75	7.74	16.05	1.97	48,40	13,91	40.16	4.80	66.02	4.32,47	8492
3	Erki Nool (EST)	10,77	7.88	14.18	1.97	47,37	15,03	40.72	5.50	63.64	4.42,39	8447
4	Lev Lobodin (UKR)	10,85	7.14	15.59	1.97	48,39	14,34	46.24	5.10	58.02	4.35,34	8315
5	Frank Busemann (GER)	10,90	7.73	13.84	2.00	49,81	13,55	40.64	4.80	60.78	4.35,67	8238
6	Vitaliy Kolpakov (UKR)	10,98	7.46	15.05	2.00	49,19	14,57	50.84	4.70	54.86	4.45,27	8155
7	Frank Müller (GER)	10,92	7.11	14.49	1.97	49,55	14,91	47.26	5.00	62.26	4.39,55	8125
8	Dirk-Achim Pajonk (GER)	10,78	7.47	14.78	1.94	48,01	14,76	43.80	4.50	55.84	4.26,30	8096
9	Klaus Isekenmeier (GER)	11,13	7.62	15.44	1.91	49,25	14,79	44.94	4.50	64.46	4.36,91	8092
10	Thorsten Dauth (GER)	10,75	7.21	16.00	1.97	49,23	14,57	50.92	4.40	56.34	4.55,87	8048
11	Kamil Damašek (CZE)	11,19	6.99	14.18	1.97	47,46	15,01	43.34	4.70	54.46	4.16,44	7971
12	Zsolt Kürtösi (HUN)	11,08	7.21	14.53	2.06	50,55	14,52	43.80	4.70	57.88	4.40,84	7966
13	Eugenio Balanqué (CUB)	11,01	6.71	14.38	2.00	48,44	14,60	43.16	4.60	61.94	4.37,10	7931
14	Sebastian Chmara (POL)	11,39	7.41	13.79	1.94	49,33	14,95	43.62	5.10	52.56	4.26,32	7930
15	Jiří Ryba (CZE)	11,07	7.21	14.05	2.03	49,25	14,67	37.08	4.60	51.38	4.15,91	7854
16	Mike Maczey (GER)	11,25	7.42	14.63	1.97	51,06	14,73	41,18	4.60	59.64	4.38,60	7812
17	Raúl Duany (CUB)	11,46	718	12.31	2.06	49,78	14,80	41.06	4.30	61.86	4.26,78	7721
18	Robert Wärff (SWE)	11,19	7.31	15.56	1.91	50,22	14,71	45.94	4.40	53.80	5.06,28	7629
19	Simon Shirley (AUS)	11,25	7.19	14.34	1.91	49,89	15,41	40.86	4.70	62.92	4.57,68	7614
20	Pierre Faber (RSA)	11,27	6.92	15.94	2.06	50,69	15,88	46.54	4.30	55.46	4.56,90	7581
21	Dmitri Sukhomazov (BLR)	11,50	6.91	13.78	2.06	51,35	15,18	38.36	4.70	60.04	4.53,74	7484
22	Gerhard Röser (AUT)	11,11	7.00	14.50	1.91	50,53	15,04	45.34	4.60	51.36	5.18,91	7396
23	Dezső Szabó (HUN)	10,94	7.40	14.17	2.00	49,17	14,67	40.40	5.20	54.92	NM	7376
24	Klaus Ambrosch (AUT)	11,13	7.31	12.70	1.91	50,13	15,67	40.36	4.00	60.42	4.41,93	7372
25	Thomas Tebbich (AUT)	11,41	6.60	13.30	1.97	50,03	15,50	40.92	4.50	57.54	4.49,77	7320
26	Patrik Andersson (SWE)	11,26	7.07	14.64	1.91	50,26	15,21	38.56	4.40	51.84	4.58,03	7305
27	Jürgen Thaler (AUT)	11,30	6.97	12.72	1.85	49,57	15,85	37.46	4.20	49.78	4.33,11	7102
28	Simon Poelman (NZL)	11,04	7.06	15.45	1.97	51,01	14,57	44.22	4.20	55.66	NM	7041

== Women's heptathlon ==
=== Schedule ===
May 25
1. 100 m hurdles
2. High Jump
3. Shot Put
4. 200 m

May 26
5. Long Jump
6. Javelin Throw
7. 800 m

=== Records ===
World Record	Jackie Joyner-Kersee (USA)	7291	September 24, 1988	Seoul, South Korea
Event Record	Sabine Braun (GER)	6985	May 31, 1992	Götzis, Austria

=== Results ===
Rank	Athlete	Heptathlon							Points
Rank	Athlete	1	2	3	4	5	6	7	Points
1	Ghada Shouaa (SYR)	13.78	1.87	15.64	23.78	6.77	54.74	2:13.61	6942
2	Denise Lewis (GBR)	13.18	1.84	14.36	24.06	6.60	47.86	2:16.84	6645
3	Sabine Braun (GER)								6626
4	Mona Steigauf (GER)								6450
5	Peggy Beer (GER)								6431
6	Anzhela Atroshchenko (BLR)								6135
7	Irina Tyukhay (RUS)								6128
8	Ines Krause (GER)								6101

== See also ==
- 1996 Decathlon Year Ranking
- Athletics at the 1996 Summer Olympics – Men's decathlon
- Athletics at the 1996 Summer Olympics – Women's heptathlon
