= 1996 European Athletics Indoor Championships – Men's heptathlon =

The men's heptathlon event at the 1996 European Athletics Indoor Championships was held in Stockholm Globe Arena on 9–10 March.

== Results ==
The highest mark recorded in each event is highlighted in yellow

Rank	Athlete	Nationality	60m	LJ	SP	HJ	60m H	PV	1000m	Points	Notes
1st place, gold medalist(s)	Erki Nool	Estonia	6.90	7.63	13.82	2.02	8.30	5.35	2:43.40	6188	
2nd place, silver medalist(s)	Tomáš Dvořák	Czech Republic	6.96	7.55	15.52	1.96	7.94	4.75	2:42.10	6114	
3rd place, bronze medalist(s)	Jón Arnar Magnússon	Iceland	6.89	7.70	15.92	2.02	8.91	4.95	2:43.63	6069	
4	Sebastian Chmara	Poland	7.29	7.35	14.31	2.02	8.17	5.15	2:40.18	6016	
5	Dezsõ Szabó	Hungary	7.14	7.25	14.19	1.96	8.22	5.15	2:41.28	5957	
6	Sándór Munkácsi	Hungary	7.05	7.38	13.50	2.02	8.06	4.55	2:40.57	5899	
7	Mike Maczey	Germany	7.26	7.32	14.48	2.08	8.11	4.65	2:45.82	5887	
8	Kamil Damašek	Czech Republic	7.22	6.98	15.02	2.02	8.38	4.65	2:34.29	5858	
9	Sébastien Levicq	France	7.30	7.02	13.86	1.96	8.16	5.45	2:49.69	5846	
10	Patrik Andersson	Sweden	7.24	7.31	15.20	1.96	8.29	4.95	2:48.30	5844	
11	Gianni Iapichino	Italy	7.18	7.50	13.24	2.02	8.51	5.35	2:59.66	5803	
12	Prodromos Korkizoglou	Greece	6.84	7.06	13.94	1.99	8.20	4.85	3:04.19	5708	
13	Martin Otte	Germany	7.22	6.80	13.57	1.90	8.28	4.55	2:48.00	5463	
	Alex Kruger	Great Britain	7.23	7.23	14.68	2.11	8.34	4.65	DNS	DNF	
	Andrei Nazarov	Estonia	7.09	DNS	–	–	–	–	–	DNF	
