= 2001 IAAF World Indoor Championships – Men's heptathlon =

The men's heptathlon event at the 2001 IAAF World Indoor Championships was held on March 10–11.

== Results ==
The highest mark recorded in each event is highlighted in yellow

Rank	Athlete	Nationality	60m	LJ	SP	HJ	60m H	PV	1000m	Points	Notes
1st place, gold medalist(s)	Roman Šebrle	Czech Republic	7.00	7.88	15.75	2.08	7.86	4.90	2:37.86	6420	WL
2nd place, silver medalist(s)	Jón Arnar Magnússon	Iceland	7.07	7.74	16.34	2.05	8.09	4.90	2:44.99	6233	SB
3rd place, bronze medalist(s)	Lev Lobodin	Russia	6.99	7.27	16.39	1.93	7.86	5.20	2:43.59	6202	SB
4	Stephen Moore	United States	7.03	7.46	12.65	2.14	8.06	5.10	2:42.35	6132	PB
5	Erki Nool	Estonia	7.01	7.60	14.89	1.93	8.02	5.00	2:44.38	6074	SB
6	Aleksandr Yurkov	Ukraine	6.99	7.55	14.10	1.96	8.19	5.20	2:45.04	6059	
7	Mário Aníbal	Portugal	7.08	6.99	15.08	1.96	8.20	4.90	2:44.13	5867	
	Chris Huffins	United States	6.91	7.29	14.75	1.93	DNS	–	–	DNF	
