= 1999 IAAF Combined Events Challenge =

The 1999 IAAF Combined Events Challenge was the second edition of the annual competition for decathletes and heptathletes, organised by the world's governing body IAAF.

== Men ==
Rank	Athlete	First Meet		Second Meet		Third Meet		Points
Rank	Athlete	Points	Venue	Points	Venue	Points	Venue	Points
1st place, gold medalist(s)	Tomáš Dvořák (CZE)	8738	Götzis	8994	Prague	8744	Seville	26476
2nd place, silver medalist(s)	Roman Šebrle (CZE)	8426	Götzis	8527	Prague	8231	Talence	25184
3rd place, bronze medalist(s)	Chris Huffins (USA)	8350	Eugene	8170	Winnipeg	8547	Seville	25067
4	Lev Lobodin (RUS)	8427	Götzis	8138	Huddinge	8494	Seville	25059
5	Erki Nool (EST)	8460	Götzis	7568	Seville	8664	Talence	24692
6	Sébastien Levicq (FRA)	8345	Prague	8524	Seville	7379	Talence	24248
7	David Mewes (GER)	8018	Götzis	8107	Ratingen	8089	Seville	24214
8	Dan Steele (USA)	7938	Eugene	8070	Winnipeg	8130	Seville	24138
9	Henrik Dagård (SWE)	7988	Götzis	8150	Seville	7994	Talence	24132
10	Indrek Kaseorg (EST)	7983	Desenzano	7925	Götzis	8059	Talence	23967
11	Zsolt Kürtösi (HUN)	7854	Götzis	7901	Mallorca	7815	Talence	23570
12	Rick Wassenaar (NED)	7817	Götzis	7604	Prague	7872	Ratingen	23293
13	Aki Heikkinen (FIN)	7675	Götzis	7849	Huddinge	7536	Seville	23060
