= 1999 World Championships in Athletics – Men's decathlon =

These are the official results of the men's decathlon competition at the 1999 World Championships in Seville, Spain. There were a total number of 25 participating athletes, including nine non-finishers. The competition started on Tuesday August 24, 1999, and ended on Wednesday August 25, 1999. The event was one of the permit meetings of the 1999 IAAF World Combined Events Challenge.

== Medalists ==
Gold	Tomáš Dvořák; Czech Republic (CZE)
Silver	(United Kingdom) Dean Macey; Great Britain (GBR)
Bronze	Chris Huffins; United States (USA)

== Schedule ==
Tuesday, August 24
1. 100 m
2. Long Jump
3. Shot Put
4. High Jump
5. 400 m

Wednesday, August 25
6. 110 m hurdles
7. Discus Throw
8. Pole Vault
9. Javelin Throw
10. 1,500 m

== Records ==
Standing records prior to the 1999 World Athletics Championships
World Record	Tomáš Dvořák (CZE)	8994	July 4, 1999	Prague, Czech Republic
Event Record	Tomáš Dvořák (CZE)	8837	August 6, 1997	Athens, Greece
Season Best	Tomáš Dvořák (CZE)	8994	July 4, 1999	Prague, Czech Republic

== Results ==
The highest mark recorded in each event is highlighted in yellow. These marks were split between eight competitors with the gold medallist claiming three of them.

Rank	Athlete	Decathlon										Points
Rank	Athlete	1	2	3	4	5	6	7	8	9	10	Points
1st place, gold medalist(s)	Tomáš Dvořák (CZE)	10.60	7.98	16.49	2.00	48.42	13.75	46.26	4.60	70.11	4:39.87	8744
2nd place, silver medalist(s)	Dean Macey (GBR)	10.69	7.48	15.14	2.12	46.72	14.35	43.78	4.60	64.03	4:29.31	8556
3rd place, bronze medalist(s)	Chris Huffins (USA)	10.43	7.67	15.67	2.00	49.04	13.98	49.48	4.80	64.35	4:53.83	8547
4	Sébastien Levicq (FRA)	11.05	7.52	14.22	2.00	50.13	14.48	44.65	5.50	69.01	4:26.81	8524
5	Lev Lobodin (RUS)	10.80	7.40	16.13	2.03	49.23	14.04	47.04	5.10	58.13	4:35.50	8494
6	Wilfrid Boulineau (FRA)	11.02	7.35	13.52	2.03	49.75	14.57	43.43	4.80	63.61	4:26.74	8154
7	Henrik Dagård (SWE)	10.77	7.06	14.95	1.97	47.88	14.35	42.35	4.80	64.77	4:47.99	8150
8	Dan Steele (USA)	10.84	6.75	14.12	1.91	47.04	14.50	50.35	4.50	65.50	4:38.03	8130
9	David Mewes (GER)	11.25	7.43	14.87	2.03	49.87	14.63	44.49	4.60	63.04	4:35.97	8089
10	Attila Zsivoczky (HUN)	11.22	7.05	14.05	2.12	48.56	15.24	42.64	4.60	60.36	4:24.59	8019
11	Oleg Veretelnikov (UZB)	10.98	7.10	13.85	1.85	48.92	14.89	42.12	4.60	64.43	4:32.18	7853
12	Indrek Kaseorg (EST)	11.34	7.03	14.03	1.91	49.28	14.56	43.30	4.80	64.38	4:44.07	7851
13	Prodromos Korkizoglou (GRE)	10.68	7.08	14.73	2.03	49.10	14,44	43.16	4.90	54.97	5:23.02	7850
14	Erki Nool (EST)	10.72	7.85	14.23	1.97	47.13	14.47	43.12	NM	70.22	4:50.52	7568
15	Aki Heikkinen (FIN)	11.16	7.07	13.98	1.94	49.79	14.94	36.60	4.40	67.75	5:03.12	7536
16	Francisco Javier Benet (ESP)	10.93	7.22	13.96	2.00	48.18	14,07	44.30	4.90	61.52	DNF	7529
—	Trond Høiby (NOR)	11.31	6.85	14.52	2.03	50.11	DSQ	43.88	4.60	DNS	—	DNF
—	Roman Šebrle (CZE)	10.93	7.65	14.44	2.03	48.08	DNF	20.51	NM	DNS	—	DNF
—	Tom Pappas (USA)	11.24	7.19	14.31	2.12	48.95	14.16	44.08	NM	DNS	—	DNF
—	Chiel Warners (NED)	10.76	7.47	14.34	2.03	47.71	15.02	38.65	DNS	—	—	DNF
—	Benjamin Jensen (NOR)	10.88	7.00	13.35	NM	DNS	—	—	—	—	—	DNF
—	Klaus Isekenmeier (GER)	11.16	7.20	15.16	1.88	DNS	—	—	—	—	—	DNF
—	Thomas Tebbich (AUT)	10.90	6.85	13.96	DNS	—	—	—	—	—	—	DNF
—	Frank Busemann (GER)	10.87	7.60	DNS	—	—	—	—	—	—	—	DNF
—	Jón Arnar Magnússon (ISL)	10.94	DNS	—	—	—	—	—	—	—	—	DNF

== See also ==
- 1998 Men's European Championships Decathlon
- 1999 Hypo-Meeting
- 1999 Decathlon Year Ranking
- 2000 Men's Olympic Decathlon
