= 1995 Hypo-Meeting =

The 21st annual Hypo-Meeting took place on May 27 and May 28, 1995 in Götzis, Austria. The track and field competition featured a decathlon (men) and a heptathlon (women) event.

== Men's Decathlon ==
=== Schedule ===
May 27
1. 100 m
2. Long Jump
3. Shot Put
4. High Jump
5. 400 m

May 28
6. 110 m hurdles
7. Discus Throw
8. Pole Vault
9. Javelin Throw
10. 1,500 m

=== Records ===
World Record	Dan O'Brien (USA)	8891	September 5, 1992	Talence, France
Event Record	Eduard Hämäläinen (BLR)	8735	May 29, 1994	Götzis, Austria

=== Results ===
Rank	Athlete	Decathlon										Points
Rank	Athlete	1	2	3	4	5	6	7	8	9	10	Points
1	Erki Nool (EST)	10,71	8.10	14.13	1.99	46,98	14,79	39.16	5.40	65.42	4.37,51	8575
2	Eduard Hämäläinen (BLR)	10,91	7.26	15.51	2.02	47,20	13,83	45.84	5.00	58.26	4.39,00	8438
3	Michael Kohnle (GER)	10,93	7.41	15.29	2.05	49,10	14,40	47.06	5.20	58.76	4.57,49	8302
4	Tomáš Dvořák (CZE)	10,99	7.45	14.83	1.96	48,44	14,11	43.20	4.60	66.68	4.32,18	8268
5	Jón Arnar Magnússon (ISL)	10,77	7.45	15.37	2.02	47,82	14,32	46.96	4.90	58.94	5.09,22	8237
6	Christian Plaziat (FRA)	11,16	7.49	14.44	2.05	49,19	14,41	44.66	5.10	53.22	4.34,14	8191
7	Thorsten Dauth (GER)	10,81	6.98	16.46	1.99	48,90	14,31	49.86	4.30	56.44	4.33,19	8164
8	Paul Meier (GER)	11,27	7.40	15.79	2.08	49,63	14,92	46.02	4.70	63.56	4.47,79	8149
9	Alex Kruger (GBR)	11,19	7.30	14.01	2.17	50,70	14,76	39.74	4.90	60.98	4.34,00	8098
10	Ramil Ganiyev (UZB)	11,18	7.21	13.84	2.05	48,56	14,42	42.34	5.10	53.66	4.32,53	8081
11	Lev Lobodin (UKR)	10,99	7.18	15.06	1.99	49,12	14,23	42.56	5.00	53.38	4.41,90	8042
12	Indrek Kaseorg (EST)	11,35	7.16	13.48	2.11	48,59	14,26	40.34	4.70	56.46	4.21,02	8041
13	Robert Změlík (CZE)	11,02	7.15	13.42	1.96	49,61	14,16	39.52	5.20	62.18	4.42,14	8018
14	Frank Müller (GER)	11,22	7.23	14.32	1.96	48,83	14,68	46.20	4.80	63.14	4.47,64	8013
15	Petri Keskitalo (FIN)	11,08	7.45	14.97	1.93	51,66	14,50	46.02	4.90	64.30	4.58,67	7982
16	Mirko Spada (SUI)	11,15	7.03	15.81	1.90	49,72	14,24	46.32	4.60	56.22	4.35,18	7950
17	Robert Wärff (SWE)	11,41	7.21	15.22	1.99	50,47	14,88	43.72	4.60	64.58	4.40,03	7907
18	Simon Poelman (NZL)	11,35	7.17	15.24	2.02	51,45	14,52	43.92	4.80	56.76	4.37,46	7900
19	Sébastien Levicq (FRA)	11,31	7.19	13.80	1.99	50,77	14,71	36.64	5.00	65.76	4.39,77	7840
20	Simon Shirley (AUS)	11,12	7.24	14.59	1.93	49,80	15,05	40.84	4.40	62.06	4.27,14	7822
21	Rolf Schläfli (SUI)	11,22	7.26	14.57	2.02	48,93	15,04	41.52	4.30	59.36	4.35,04	7821
22	Stefan Schneider (SUI)	11,42	7.07	13.35	1.99	50,64	14,69	40.28	4.80	62.62	4.28,45	7805
23	Leonhard Hudec (AUT)	11,22	7.26	11.91	1.99	48,97	14,68	36.44	4.60	59.44	4.42,93	7609
24	Philipp Huber (SUI)	11,32	6.96	14.55	1.90	48,97	15,04	37.56	4.60	49.98	4.18,96	7591
25	Jiří Ryba (CZE)	11,38	7.04	12.79	2.02	49,90	15,16	38.96	4.40	52.24	4.23,28	7511
26	Danie van Wyk (RSA)	11,40	6.63	14.18	1.90	50,87	15,44	42.20	4.20	55.14	4.33,81	7293
27	Thomas Tebbich (AUT)	11,33	6.76	12.97	2.02	49,91	15,49	40.42	4.40	53.06	4.57,66	7254
—	Michael Smith (CAN)	10,95	7.21	15.60	1.93	47,94	14,71	52.86	—	66.88	—	DNF
—	Gerhard Röser (AUT)	11,03	7.01	14.49	DNS	—	—	—	—	—	—	DNF

== Women's Heptathlon ==
=== Schedule ===
May 27
1. 100 m hurdles
2. High Jump
3. Shot Put
4. 200 m

May 28
5. Long Jump
6. Javelin Throw
7. 800 m

=== Records ===
World Record	Jackie Joyner-Kersee (USA)	7291	September 24, 1988	Seoul, South Korea
Event Record	Sabine Braun (GER)	6985	May 31, 1992	Götzis, Austria

=== Results ===
Rank	Athlete	Heptathlon							Points
Rank	Athlete	1	2	3	4	5	6	7	Points
1	Ghada Shouaa (SYR)	14,02	1.84	15.18	24.34	6.68	55.56	2:17,72	6715
2	Sabine Braun (GER)	13,40	1,90	14,12	24,09	6,30	50,22	2:17,01	6617
3	Irina Tyukhay (RUS)								6604
4	Svetlana Moskalets (RUS)								6583
5	Peggy Beer (GER)								6363
6	Denise Lewis (GBR)								6255

== See also ==
- 1995 World Championships in Athletics – Men's decathlon
- 1995 World Championships in Athletics – Women's heptathlon
