= 1998 European Athletics Championships – Men's decathlon =

Men's decathlon at the European Athletics Championships

The men's decathlon competition at the 1998 European Athletics Championships in Budapest, Hungary, was held on 18 August and 19 August 1998. The event was one of the permit meetings of the inaugural 1998 IAAF World Combined Events Challenge.

== Medalists ==
Gold	Erki Nool; Estonia (EST)
Silver	Eduard Hämäläinen; Finland (FIN)
Bronze	Lev Lobodin; Russia (RUS)

== Schedule ==
18 August
1. 100 m
2. Long jump
3. Shot put
4. High jump
5. 400 m

19 August
6. 110 m hurdles
7. Discus throw
8. Pole vault
9. Javelin throw
10. 1,500 m

== Records ==
World record	Dan O'Brien (USA)	8891	5 September 1992	Talence, France
Event record	Daley Thompson (GBR)	8811	28 August 1986	Stuttgart, West Germany

== Results ==
Best marks for each event are highlighted.

Rank	Athlete	Decathlon										Points
Rank	Athlete	1	2	3	4	5	6	7	8	9	10	Points
1st place, gold medalist(s)	Erki Nool (EST)	10.58	7.80	14.40	1.97	46.67	14.68	40.79	5.40	70.65	4:38.00	8667
2nd place, silver medalist(s)	Eduard Hämäläinen (FIN)	10.87	7.44	16.04	2.06	46.95	13.96	47.85	5.00	55.34	4:33.98	8587
3rd place, bronze medalist(s)	Lev Lobodin (RUS)	10.66	7.42	15.67	2.03	48.65	13.97	46.55	5.20	56.55	4:30.27	8571
4	Jón Arnar Magnússon (ISL)	10.60	7.39	16.03	1.97	46.49	14.12	39.34	5.10	63.99	4:32.23	8552
5	Tomáš Dvořák (CZE)	10.77	7.61	15.87	1.97	48.11	14.07	46.38	4.70	65.12	4:34.62	8506
6	Roman Šebrle (CZE)	10.73	7.60	14.90	2.09	48.28	14.27	42.57	4.90	62.82	4:35.21	8477
7	Dezső Szabó (HUN)	10.85	7.58	13.72	2.03	48.13	14.39	42.80	5.00	59.62	4:20.42	8392
8	Mike Maczey (GER)	11.16	7.29	13.77	2.06	49.82	14.41	42.46	4.90	63.27	4:26.82	8174
9=	Zsolt Kürtösi (HUN)	11.19	7.26	14.90	2.03	49.07	14.39	46.38	4.70	58.05	4:33.14	8140
9=	Klaus Isekenmeier (GER)	11.03	7.42	15.22	1.79	48.29	14.50	51.28	4.60	61.65	4:37.95	8140
11	Jack Rosendaal (NED)	11.19	7.02	14.05	2.06	50.43	14.53	42.70	4.90	63.89	4:20.39	8135
12	Philipp Huber (SUI)	10.94	7.12	14.42	1.85	47.87	14.74	44.66	4.90	58.57	4:23.27	8081
13	Oleksandr Yurkov (UKR)	10.90	7.47	14.53	2.03	49.55	15.09	47.56	4.90	51.88	4:46.88	8030
14	Stefan Schmid (GER)	10.92	7.26	14.73	1.91	48.45	14.79	41.09	4.60	68.22	4:43.21	8011
15	Henrik Dagård (SWE)	10.81	6.88	14.36	1.94	47.97	14.75	42.07	4.80	63.64	4:52.58	7930
16	Attila Zsivoczky (HUN)	11.27	6.56	14.17	2.18	49.62	15.59	42.22	4.50	62.90	4:23.54	7876
17	Rolf Schläfli (SUI)	11.10	6.94	14.96	1.94	48.11	14.95	35.49	4.40	64.85	4:32.44	7778
18	Wilfrid Boulineau (FRA)	11.04	7.20	13.07	2.03	49.55	15.04	41.33	4.40	57.85	4:45.49	7672
19	Gaëtan Blouin (FRA)	11.21	7.04	11.46	2.06	49.77	15.01	39.54	4.80	53.43	4:42.94	7549
20	Jaime Peñas (ESP)	11.18	7.05	15.31	2.06	50.41	15.12	45.17	4.60	59.48	DNF	7236
—	Sébastien Levicq (FRA)	11.21	6.86	14.77	1.94	51.45	15.06	42.63	DNS	—	—	DNF
—	Francisco Javier Benet (ESP)	11.17	7.12	13.54	1.91	48.62	14.56	39.86	DNS	—	—	DNF
—	Sebastian Chmara (POL)	11.19	7.65	15.48	2.09	47.76	14.84	DNS	—	—	—	DNF
—	Georgios Andreou (CYP)	10.93	6.80	13.03	1.94	DNS	—	—	—	—	—	DNF
—	Prodromos Korkizoglou (GRE)	10.77	7.03	13.54	1.97	DNS	—	—	—	—	—	DNF
—	Antonio Peñalver (ESP)	11.18	7.02	16.18	X	DNS	—	—	—	—	—	DNF

== See also ==
- 1997 Men's World Championships Decathlon
- 1998 Hypo-Meeting
- 1998 Decathlon Year Ranking
- 1999 World Championships in Athletics – Men's decathlon
