= 2004 IAAF World Indoor Championships – Men's heptathlon =

The men's heptathlon event at the 2004 IAAF World Indoor Championships was held on March 6–7.

== Medalists ==
Gold	Silver	Bronze
Roman Šebrle; Czech Republic	Bryan Clay; United States	Lev Lobodin; Russia

== Results ==
=== 60 metres ===
Rank	Lane	Name	Nationality	Time	Points	Notes
1	6	Bryan Clay	United States	6.65	1010	PB
2	8	Lev Lobodin	Russia	6.90	918	SB
3	7	Erki Nool	Estonia	6.96	897	SB
4	5	Roman Šebrle	Czech Republic	6.97	893	SB
5	1	Jón Arnar Magnússon	Iceland	7.02	875	SB
6	2	Ranko Leskovar	Slovenia	7.04	868	
7	4	Dmitriy Karpov	Kazakhstan	7.04	868	PB
8	3	Aleksandr Pogorelov	Russia	7.07	858	

=== Long jump ===
Rank	Athlete	Nationality	#1	#2	#3	Result	Points	Notes	Overall
1	Dmitriy Karpov	Kazakhstan	7.58	7.97	7.82	7.97	1053		1921
2	Roman Šebrle	Czech Republic	7.80	7.96	X	7.96	1050	SB	1943
3	Bryan Clay	United States	7.41	7.78	7.72	7.78	1005	SB	2015
4	Jón Arnar Magnússon	Iceland	7.64	7.46	7.36	7.64	970	SB	1845
5	Erki Nool	Estonia	X	7.57	4.90	7.57	952		1849
6	Ranko Leskovar	Slovenia	7.15	7.52	7.34	7.52	940	SB	1808
7	Aleksandr Pogorelov	Russia	7.11	7.18	7.49	7.49	932		1790
8	Lev Lobodin	Russia	7.06	7.36	X	7.36	900	SB	1818

=== Shot put ===
Rank	Athlete	Nationality	#1	#2	#3	Result	Points	Notes	Overall
1	Roman Šebrle	Czech Republic	15.43	16.28	X	16.28	869	PB	2812
2	Lev Lobodin	Russia	15.12	15.99	X	15.99	851	SB	2669
3	Jón Arnar Magnússon	Iceland	15.77	15.72	X	15.77	837		2682
4	Aleksandr Pogorelov	Russia	14.66	15.21	15.25	15.25	805		2595
5	Dmitriy Karpov	Kazakhstan	14.39	14.95	X	14.95	787	SB	2708
6	Erki Nool	Estonia	14.43	14.90	14.84	14.90	784	SB	2633
7	Bryan Clay	United States	14.84	14.16	X	14.84	780		2795
8	Ranko Leskovar	Slovenia	X	13.05	X	13.05	670		2478

=== High jump ===
Rank	Athlete	Nationality	1.90	1.93	1.96	1.99	2.02	2.05	2.08	2.11	2.14	Result	Points	Notes	Overall
1	Roman Šebrle	Czech Republic	–	–	xo	–	o	o	o	o	xxx	2.11	906	SB	3718
2	Aleksandr Pogorelov	Russia	–	–	o	xo	o	o	xxo	xxx		2.08	878		3473
3	Bryan Clay	United States	o	–	xo	xo	o	xo	xxo	xxx		2.08	878	PB	3673
4	Lev Lobodin	Russia	o	–	o	o	o	o	xxx			2.05	850	SB	3519
5	Dmitriy Karpov	Kazakhstan	–	o	–	o	xxx					1.99	794		3572
6	Ranko Leskovar	Slovenia	–	xxo	o	xxx						1.96	767		3245
7	Jón Arnar Magnússon	Iceland	o	–	xo	xxx						1.96	767	SB	3449
8	Erki Nool	Estonia	xo	o	xxo	xxx						1.96	767		3400

=== 60 metres hurdles ===
Rank	Lane	Name	Nationality	Time	Points	Notes	Overall
1	2	Bryan Clay	United States	7.77	1040	PB	4713
2	6	Lev Lobodin	Russia	7.83	1025	SB	4544
3	8	Dmitriy Karpov	Kazakhstan	7.87	1015	SB	4517
4	1	Roman Šebrle	Czech Republic	7.95	994		4712
5	5	Jón Arnar Magnússon	Iceland	8.08	962	SB	4411
6	3	Aleksandr Pogorelov	Russia	8.13	949	SB	4422
7	7	Ranko Leskovar	Slovenia	8.23	925		4170
8	4	Erki Nool	Estonia	8.33	900		4300

=== Pole vault ===
Rank	Athlete	Nationality	4.40	4.50	4.60	4.70	4.80	4.90	5.00	5.10	5.30	Result	Points	Notes	Overall
1	Erki Nool	Estonia	–	–	–	–	–	–	–	xxo	xxx	5.10	941	SB	5241
2	Aleksandr Pogorelov	Russia	–	–	xo	–	o	o	xxx			4.90	880		5302
3	Bryan Clay	United States	–	–	o	xo	o	xo	xxx			4.90	880	PB	5593
4	Roman Šebrle	Czech Republic	o	–	xo	–	o	xxx				4.80	849		5561
5	Lev Lobodin	Russia	–	–	–	–	xo	–	xxx			4.80	849		5393
6	Jón Arnar Magnússon	Iceland	–	–	o	–	xxx					4.60	790		5201
7	Dmitriy Karpov	Kazakhstan	xo	xxo	o	xxx						4.60	790		5307
8	Ranko Leskovar	Slovenia	o	xxx								4.40	731		4901

=== 1000 metres ===
Rank	Name	Nationality	Time	Points	Notes
1	Roman Šebrle	Czech Republic	2:39.67	877	SB
2	Erki Nool	Estonia	2:41.94	852	SB
3	Dmitriy Karpov	Kazakhstan	2:42.34	848	PB
4	Lev Lobodin	Russia	2:45.76	810	SB
5	Jón Arnar Magnússon	Iceland	2:47.52	792	SB
6	Bryan Clay	United States	2:49.41	772	PB
7	Aleksandr Pogorelov	Russia	2:54.44	720	SB
8	Ranko Leskovar	Slovenia	2:55.27	711	PB

=== Final results ===
The highest mark recorded in each event is highlighted in yellow

Rank	Athlete	Nationality	60m	LJ	SP	HJ	60m H	PV	1000m	Points	Notes
1st place, gold medalist(s)	Roman Šebrle	Czech Republic	6.97	7.96	16.28	2.11	7.95	4.80	2:39.67	6438	WL, AR
2nd place, silver medalist(s)	Bryan Clay	United States	6.65	7.78	14.84	2.08	7.77	4.90	2:49.41	6365	PB
3rd place, bronze medalist(s)	Lev Lobodin	Russia	6.90	7.36	15.99	2.05	7.83	4.80	2:45.76	6203	SB
4	Dmitriy Karpov	Kazakhstan	7.04	7.97	14.95	1.99	7.87	4.60	2:42.34	6155	AR
5	Erki Nool	Estonia	6.96	7.57	14.90	1.96	8.33	5.10	2:41.94	6093	
6	Aleksandr Pogorelov	Russia	7.07	7.49	15.25	2.08	8.13	4.90	2:54.44	6022	
7	Jón Arnar Magnússon	Iceland	7.02	7.64	15.77	1.96	8.08	4.60	2:47.52	5993	SB
8	Ranko Leskovar	Slovenia	7.04	7.52	13.05	1.96	8.23	4.40	2:55.27	5612	
