= 1994 World Junior Championships in Athletics – Men's decathlon =

The men's decathlon event at the 1994 World Junior Championships in Athletics was held in Lisbon, Portugal, at Estádio Universitário de Lisboa on 20 and 21 July. Senior implements (106.7 cm (3'6) hurdles, 7257g shot, 2 kg discus) were used.

== Medalists ==
Gold	Benjamin Jensen; Norway
Silver	Klaus Isekenmeier; Germany
Bronze	Glenn Lindqvist; Finland

== Results ==
=== Final ===
20/21 July

The highest mark recorded in each event is highlighted in yellow

Rank	Name	Nationality	100m	LJ	SP	HJ	400m	110m H	DT	PV	JT	1500m	Points	Notes
1st place, gold medalist(s)	Benjamin Jensen	Norway	11.17 (w: 0.1 m/s)	7.27	12.23	2.00	49.32	14.40 (w: 2.0 m/s)	34.18	5.10	53.60	4:44.54	7676	
2nd place, silver medalist(s)	Klaus Isekenmeier	Germany	11.53 (w: 0.1 m/s)	7.16	13.75	1.94	50.93	15.02 (w: 2.0 m/s)	37.94	4.20	51.92	4:35.92	7298	
3rd place, bronze medalist(s)	Glenn Lindqvist	Finland	11.54 (w: 0.2 m/s)	6.78	12.30	1.85	50.64	15.32 (w: 0.7 m/s)	40.62	4.60	56.82	4:31.60	7288	
4	Alf-Gerrit Christiansen	Germany	11.38 (w: 0.9 m/s)	7.02	12.44	2.06	51.76	15.05 (w: 2.0 m/s)	33.84	4.50	48.92	4:38.79	7228	
5	Thomas Tebbich	Austria	11.46 (w: 0.7 m/s)	6.89	12.43	1.94	51.03	15.93 (w: 0.8 m/s)	35.34	4.40	58.44	4:41.64	7125	
6	Gines Hidalgo	Spain	11.14 (w: 0.9 m/s)	7.09	11.78	1.88	50.68	15.82 (w: 0.7 m/s)	38.28	4.30	50.24	4:39.79	7097	
7	Arnaud Humbey	France	11.32 (w: 0.7 m/s)	6.71	11.08	1.85	51.69	14.85 (w: 0.7 m/s)	42.12	4.00	49.22	4:30.42	7008	
8	Tage Peterson	United States	11.16 (w: 0.1 m/s)	7.22	11.70	1.91	52.46	16.17 (w: 2.0 m/s)	38.68	4.30	50.62	4:50.81	6973	
9	Maciej Mackowiak	Poland	11.38 (w: 0.9 m/s)	6.84	11.81	1.94	50.47	15.79 (w: 0.4 m/s)	33.10	4.30	51.28	4:40.09	6964	
10	Sun Chaohui	China	11.68 (w: 0.9 m/s)	6.49	12.95	1.91	51.11	16.11 (w: 0.7 m/s)	35.76	4.30	52.34	4:29.22	6935	
11	Matej Méhes	Slovakia	11.52 (w: 0.9 m/s)	6.92	12.98	2.03	52.52	15.45 (w: 0.7 m/s)	36.50	3.90	56.86	5:24.28	6841	
12	Pontus Lundkvist	Sweden	11.57 (w: 0.7 m/s)	6.61	12.43	1.88	51.09	15.96 (w: 0.8 m/s)	36.50	4.30	45.86	4:40.41	6794	
13	Marc Magrans	Spain	11.42 (w: 0.2 m/s)	6.36	11.29	1.88	49.94	15.68 (w: 0.8 m/s)	30.96	4.20	46.78	4:27.88	6736	
14	Du Xiaopeng	China	11.00 (w: 0.7 m/s)	6.44	11.38	1.88	51.33	15.53 (w: 0.7 m/s)	40.26	3.80	39.36	4:47.55	6650	
15	Hiroyuki Tagata	Japan	10.99 (w: 0.2 m/s)	6.63	9.12	1.82	51.07	15.44 (w: 0.4 m/s)	28.26	4.80	38.60	4:45.55	6577	
16	Jin Sung-Ryon	South Korea	11.44 (w: 0.2 m/s)	7.36	9.35	1.94	52.68	16.04 (w: 0.4 m/s)	25.52	4.60	39.08	4:49.65	6501	
17	Abdul Marzouk Al-Shahrani	Saudi Arabia	11.52 (w: 0.2 m/s)	6.54	10.48	1.85	50.79	16.07 (w: 0.4 m/s)	32.32	4.00	44.80	4:48.91	6408	
18	Márcio de Souza	Brazil	11.38 (w: 0.1 m/s)	6.81	11.34	1.85	52.56	15.23 (w: 0.8 m/s)	32.60	3.20	49.64	5:15.02	6286	
19	Rick Wassenaar	Netherlands	11.52 (w: 0.2 m/s)	7.02	13.30	1.85	51.04	DQ	40.52	4.20	51.58	4:57.76	6222	
	Aleksandr Yurkov	Ukraine	11.41 (w: 0.9 m/s)	6.76	13.16	1.85	51.73	15.93 (w: 0.4 m/s)	39.98	DNF	43.00	DNS	DNF	
	Pródromos Korkízoglu	Greece	10.68 (w: 0.1 m/s)	7.10	13.18	1.97	50.71	14.91 (w: 2.0 m/s)	38.60	DNF	DNS	DNS	DNF	
	Stefan Hammer	Switzerland	11.00 (w: 0.7 m/s)	6.98	11.16	1.85	49.08	15.40 (w: 0.8 m/s)	33.60	DNS	DNS	DNS	DNF	
	Gennadiy Sitkevich	Belarus	11.52 (w: 0.9 m/s)	6.79	14.37	1.88	52.31	15.45 (w: 0.4 m/s)	33.12	DNF	DNS	DNS	DNF	
	Jiří Ryba	Czech Republic	11.52 (w: 0.7 m/s)	7.18	11.48	1.88	51.11	16.53 (w: 0.8 m/s)	NM	4.20	DNS	DNS	DNF	
	Georgi Petrov	Bulgaria	11.34 (w: 0.2 m/s)	7.00	10.91	1.88	53.23	15.52 (w: 0.4 m/s)	DNS	DNS	DNS	DNS	DNF	
	Ross Bomben	United States	11.24 (w: 0.7 m/s)	5.93	DNS	DNS	DNS	DNS	DNS	DNS	DNS	DNS	DNF	
	Raúl Duany	Cuba	12.51 (w: 0.1 m/s)	NM	DNS	DNS	DNS	DNS	DNS	DNS	DNS	DNS	DNF	
	Pierre-Alexandre Vial	France	DNF (w: 0.1 m/s)	DNS	DNS	DNS	DNS	DNS	DNS	DNS	DNS	DNS	DNF	

== Participation ==
According to an unofficial count, 28 athletes from 23 countries participated in the event.

- Austria (1)
- Belarus (1)
- Brazil (1)
- Bulgaria (1)
- China (2)
- Cuba (1)
- Czech Republic (1)
- Finland (1)
- France (2)
- Germany (2)
- Greece (1)
- Japan (1)
- Netherlands (1)
- Norway (1)
- Poland (1)
- Saudi Arabia (1)
- Slovakia (1)
- South Korea (1)
- Spain (2)
- Sweden (1)
- Switzerland (1)
- Ukraine (1)
- United States (2)
