= Roman Razbeyko =

Russian decathlete

Personal information
- Nationality: Russian
- Born: 9 March 1973 (age 52); Rostov-on-Don, Soviet Union

Sport
- Sport: Athletics
- Event: Decathlon

Roman Razbeyko (born 9 March 1973) is a Russian track and field athlete. He competed in the men's decathlon at the 2000 Summer Olympics.
