= 1997 European Athletics U23 Championships – Men's decathlon =

The men's decathlon event at the 1997 European Athletics U23 Championships was held in Turku, Finland, on 10 and 11 July 1997.

== Medalists ==
Gold	Klaus Isekenmeier; Germany
Silver	Aleksandr Yurkov; Ukraine
Bronze	Pierre-Alexandre Vial; France

== Results ==
=== Final ===
10-11 July

The highest mark recorded in each event is highlighted in yellow

Rank	Name	Nationality	100m	LJ	SP	HJ	400m	110m H	DT	PV	JT	1500m	Points	Notes
1st place, gold medalist(s)	Klaus Isekenmeier	Germany	11.20 (w: 0.5 m/s)	7.46 (w: 0.4 m/s)	14.48	1.93	49.43	14.68 (w: 1.4 m/s)	44.00	4.60	58.38	4:35.79	7926	
2nd place, silver medalist(s)	Aleksandr Yurkov	Ukraine	11.01 (w: -0.4 m/s)	7.36 (w: -1.6 m/s)	13.62	1.99	50.17	15.22 (w: 1.4 m/s)	43.60	4.90	56.52	4:37.35	7888	
3rd place, bronze medalist(s)	Pierre-Alexandre Vial	France	10.97 (w: -0.4 m/s)	7.08 (w: 0.5 m/s)	12.55	1.87	48.61	14.76 (w: 1.4 m/s)	41.78	4.80	56.78	4:15.81	7866	
4	Attila Zsivoczky	Hungary	11.51 (w: 0.5 m/s)	6.81 (w: -0.4 m/s)	14.08	2.17	50.33	15.49 (w: -0.3 m/s)	43.86	4.70	57.04	4:30.09	7804	
5	Robert Jung	Germany	10.94 (w: -0.4 m/s)	7.36 (w: 0.2 m/s)	14.63	1.96	48.65	14.97 (w: -0.3 m/s)	45.92	4.20	50.42	4:39.72	7775	
6	Bart Bennema	Netherlands	10.79 (w: -0.4 m/s)	7.12 (w: -0.7 m/s)	14.18	1.96	49.63	14.10 (w: 1.4 m/s)	40.44	4.60	50.94	5:14.23	7598	
7	Marc Magrans	Spain	11.00 (w: -0.4 m/s)	6.93 (w: 0.8 m/s)	12.82	1.90	49.19	14.80 (w: -0.3 m/s)	36.54	4.30	49.38	4:15.78	7471	
8	Martin Jelínek	Czech Republic	11.51 (w: 0.5 m/s)	6.71 (w: 0.3 m/s)	11.90	1.96	51.49	15.02 (w: -0.3 m/s)	38.78	5.10	57.12	4:51.75	7341	
9	Rick Wassenaar	Netherlands	11.34 (w: 0.5 m/s)	7.20 (w: 0.9 m/s)	14.07	1.81	50.71	15.43 (w: -0.3 m/s)	41.34	4.40	52.78	4:54.12	7244	
10	Mikhail Volk	Belarus	11.38 (w: 0.5 m/s)	6.89 (w: 0.6 m/s)	13.99	1.99	52.44	15.38 (w: -0.3 m/s)	35.36	3.90	63.56	5:10.26	7053	
11	Andrey Kurdeko	Belarus	11.48 (w: 0.5 m/s)	7.03 (w: 0.7 m/s)	12.66	2.02	52.09	DQ	41.40	4.40	39.94	4:50.76	6247	
	Paolo Casarsa	Italy	11.45 (w: 0.5 m/s)	6.48 (w: -0.2 m/s)	14.04	1.81	51.66	14.69 (w: -0.3 m/s)	40.00	NM	53.66		DNF	
	Thomas Tebbich	Austria	11.16 (w: -0.4 m/s)	6.53 (w: -1.5 m/s)	13.85	1.87	52.00	15.64 (w: 1.4 m/s)	39.50	NM	61.44		DNF	
	Mikhail Merzlikin	Russia	11.51 (w: 0.5 m/s)	6.93 (w: -1.6 m/s)	12.50	1.99	51.22	15.13 (w: -0.3 m/s)					DNF	
	Jiří Ryba	Czech Republic	11.26 (w: 0.5 m/s)	7.13 (w: 0.2 m/s)	13.18	2.05	49.55						DNF	
	Benjamin Jensen	Norway	11.37 (w: 0.5 m/s)	6.61 (w: 0.5 m/s)	12.35	1.75							DNF	
	Dean Macey	Great Britain	10.99 (w: 0.5 m/s)	7.12 (w: -0.6 m/s)									DNF	

== Participation ==
According to an unofficial count, 17 athletes from 13 countries participated in the event.

- Austria (1)
- Belarus (2)
- Czech Republic (2)
- France (1)
- Germany (2)
- Great Britain (1)
- Hungary (1)
- Italy (1)
- Netherlands (2)
- Norway (1)
- Russia (1)
- Spain (1)
- Ukraine (1)
