= Martin Otte =

German decathlete

Martin Otte (born 3 May 1967) is a retired German decathlete.

He finished thirteenth at the 1996 European Indoor Championships. He represented the sports club LT DSHS Köln and won the silver medal at the German championships in 1997.
