= Thomas Tebbich =

Austrian decathlete (born 1975)

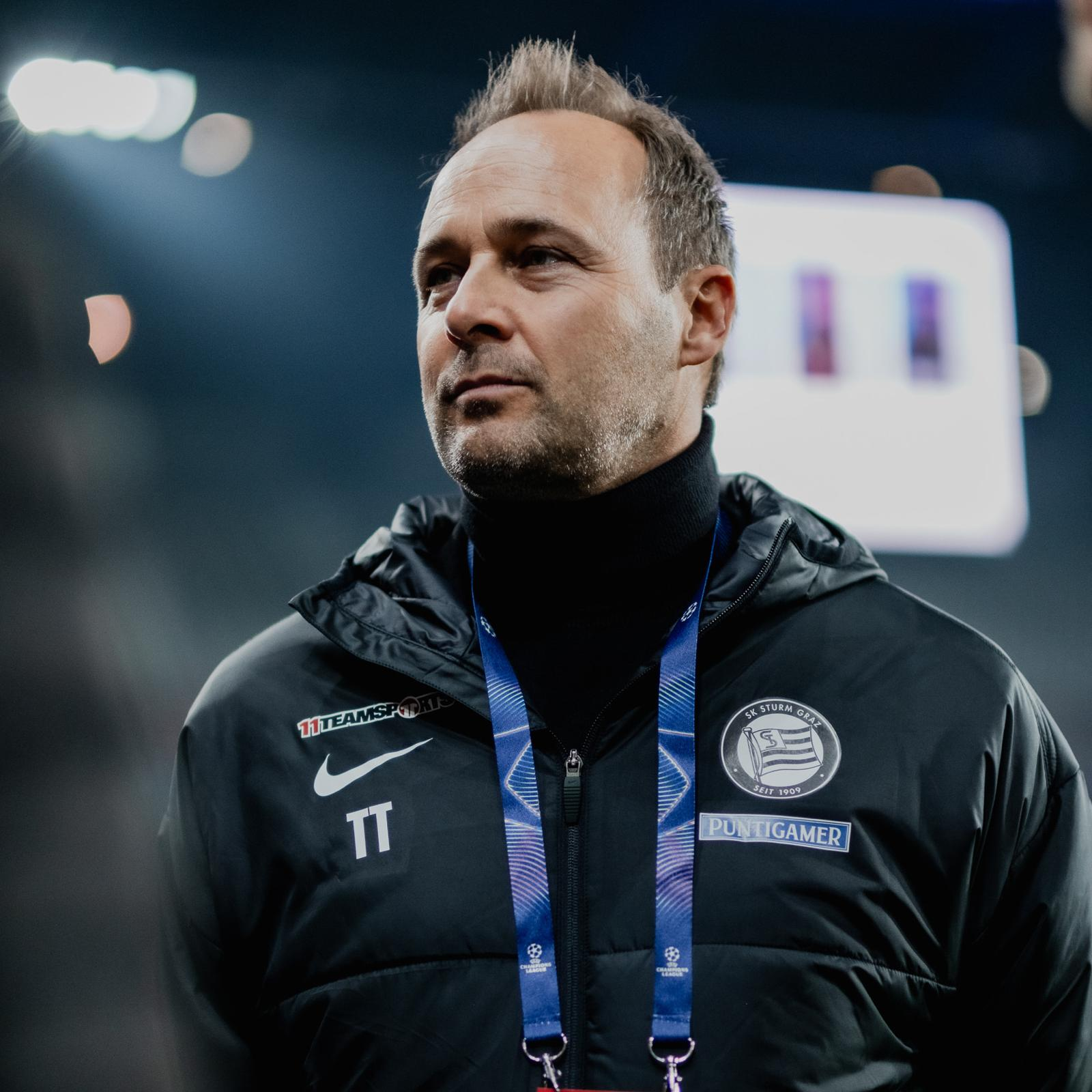
Thomas Tebbich - SK Sturm Graz

Thomas Tebbich (born 4 February 1975 in Graz, Styria) is a retired decathlete from Austria. He set his personal best score (8039 points) on 30 May 1999 in Götzis. He is a three-time national outdoor champion in the men's decathlon and one-time the men's pole vault (2004).

Since 2016, he is the chief executive officer (CEO) of the Austrian professional football club SK Sturm Graz. Previously, he held senior positions in international sport marketing and event management, including Red Bull and WWP Middle East Consultancy.

== Education ==
From 2005 to 2009, Tebbich studied at Campus 02 - University of Applied Sciences in Graz, where he earned a Master´s degree in Marketing and International Management.

== Career ==
=== SK Sturm Graz ===
Since 2016, Thomas Tebbich has been the CEO of SK Sturm Graz, one of the Austrian leading football clubs. He is responsible for the club´s financial management, match day operations with over 400,000 spectators, and services for more than 21,000 members. He oversees communication, sponsorship, marketing, merchandising, and human recourses, managing over 200 employees.

=== WWP Middle East Consultancy ===
From 2012 to 2016, Tebbich served as chief operating officer (COO) at WWP Middle East Consultancy LLC in Abu Dhabi, where he established and managed the company´s Middle East office. His key clients included IPIC, CEPSA, Nova Cemicals and the Formula 1 team Scuderia Toro Rosso, and he led major international projects such as sponsorship activation for Real Madrid CF, the Dubai World Cup Horse Racing, the Jiu-Jitsu World Professional Championship and the Judo Grand Slam in Abu Dhabi.

=== Red Bull F1 Racetrack (Red Bull Ring) ===
Between 2010 and 2012 Thomas was CEO of the Red Bull F1 Racetrack (Red Bull Ring) in Austria, overseeing infrastructure, hospitality and major motorsport events. He also managed corporate identity, marketing and over 100 employees.

== Achievements as a decathlete ==
Year	Competition	Venue	Position	Event	Notes
Representing Austria
1994	World Junior Championships	Lisbon, Portugal	5th	Decathlon	7125 pts
1995	Hypo-Meeting	Götzis, Austria	27th	Decathlon	7254 pts
1996	Hypo-Meeting	Götzis, Austria	25th	Decathlon	7320 pts
1996	National Championships	Südstadt, Austria	1st	Decathlon	7675 pts
1997	Hypo-Meeting	Götzis, Austria	18th	Decathlon	7746 pts
1997	National Championships	Wolfsberg, Austria	1st	Decathlon	7704 pts
1997	European U23 Championships	Turku, Finland	—	Decathlon	DNF
1999	Hypo-Meeting	Götzis, Austria	7th	Decathlon	8039 pts
1999	World Championships	Seville, Spain	—	Decathlon	DNF
2001	Hypo-Meeting	Götzis, Austria	13th	Decathlon	7632 pts
2001	Universiade	Beijing, China	8th	Decathlon	7578 pts
2003	Hypo-Meeting	Götzis, Austria	—	Decathlon	DNF
2004	Hypo-Meeting	Götzis, Austria	18th	Decathlon	7572 pts
2004	National Championships	Schwechat Rannersdorf, Austria	1st	Decathlon	7431 pts

== Achievements as the CEO of SK Sturm Graz ==
Year	Competition	Achievement
2018	Austrian Cup	Winner
2018	UEFA Champions League	Qualifying Round
2021	UEFA Europa League	Group Stage Participant
2022	UEFA Europa League	Group Stage Participant
2022	UEFA Champions League	Qualifying Round
2023	Austrian Cup	Winner
2023	UEFA Europa League	Group Stage Participant
2023	UEFA Champions League	Qualifying Round
2024	Austrian Cup	Winner
2024	Austrian Bundesliga	Champion
2024	UEFA Champions League	Group Stage Participant
2025	Austrian Bundesliga	Champion
2025	UEFA Europa League	Group Stage Participant
2025	UEFA Champions League	Qualifying Round
