= Benjamin Jensen =

Norwegian decathlete (born 1975)

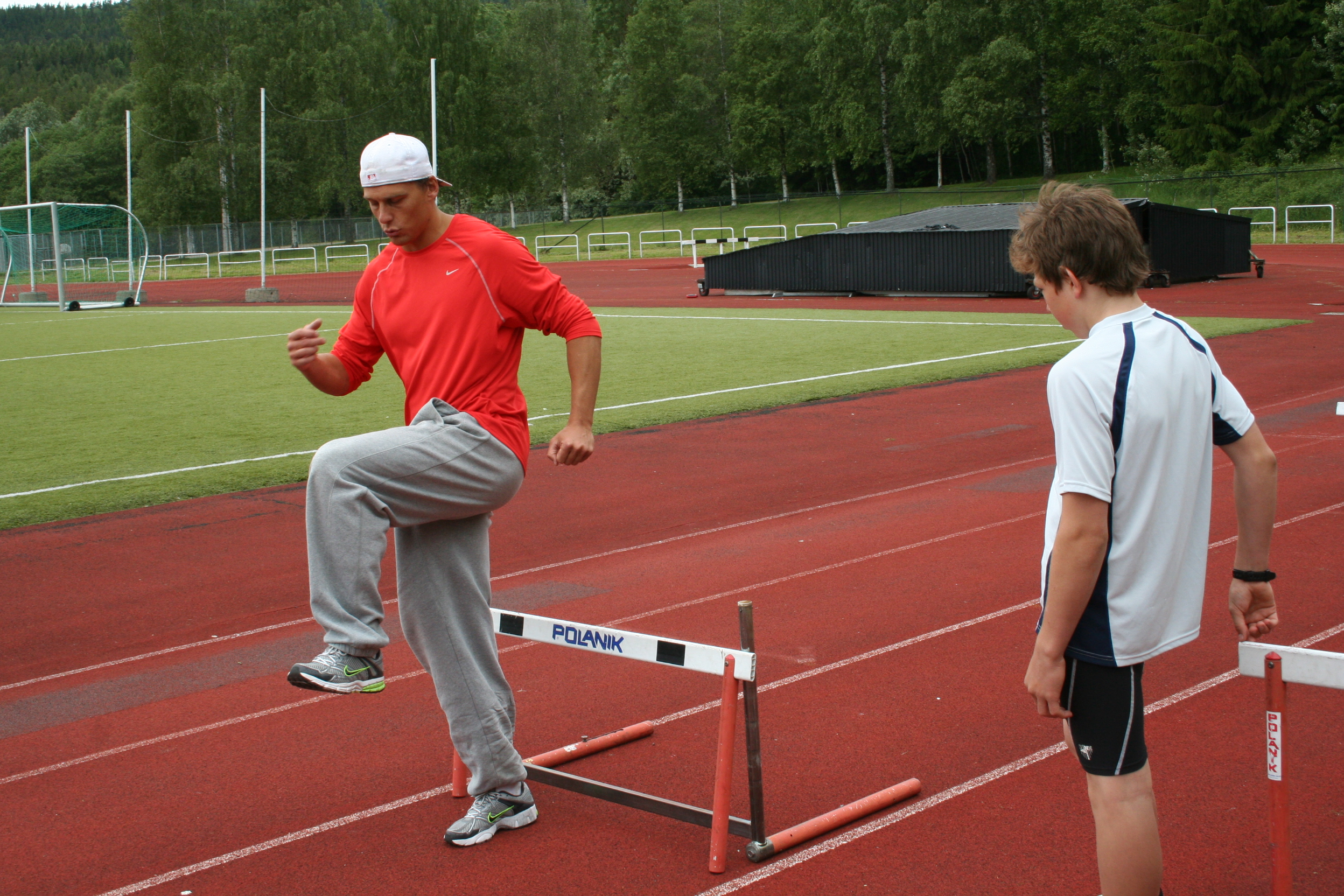
- Benjamin Jensen in 2010

Personal information
- Born: 13 April 1975 (age 51)

Sport
- Sport: Decathlon
Medal record
Representing Norway
Summer Universiade
Bronze medal – third place	1999 Palma de Mallorca	Decathlon
World Junior Championships
Gold medal – first place	1994 Lisbon	Decathlon

Benjamin Jensen (born 13 April 1975) is a Norwegian decathlete. He represented Mandal og Halse IL, IK Tjalve and IL Norna-Salhus during his active career. His personal best in decathlon is 8160 points, achieved in August 1999 in Roskilde. This is the former Norwegian record.

Jensen was the first All-American decathlete for the Minnesota Golden Gophers track and field team, finishing 3rd in the decathlon at the 1997 NCAA Division I Outdoor Track and Field Championships.

== Achievements ==
Year	Competition	Venue	Position	Event	Notes
Representing Norway
1994	World Junior Championships	Lisbon, Portugal	1st	Decathlon	7676 pts
1997	European U23 Championships	Turku, Finland	—	Decathlon	DNF
1997	Universiade	Catania, Italy	–	Decathlon	DNF
1999	Universiade	Palma de Mallorca, Spain	3rd	Decathlon	7982 pts
1999	World Championships	Seville, Spain	—	Decathlon	DNF
2001	Hypo-Meeting	Götzis, Austria	10th	Decathlon	8004 pts
2001	World Championships	Edmonton, Canada	14th	Decathlon	8090 pts
2005	World Championships	Helsinki, Finland	—	Decathlon	DNF
