= Doug Pirini =

New Zealand decathlete (born 1969)

Douglas Stuart Pirini (born 6 September 1969 in Auckland) is a retired decathlete from New Zealand, who represented his native country in the men's decathlon at the 1996 Summer Olympics in Atlanta, Georgia. There he ended up in 24th place, with a total number of 7961 points.

Pirini was also a member of the New Zealand team at the 1994 and 1998 Commonwealth Games, finishing in fourth (Victoria) and fifth place (Kuala Lumpur).
