= Trond Høiby =

Norwegian decathlete (born 1973)

Personal information
- Born: 24 January 1973 (age 53) Askim, Østfold, Norway

Sport
- Sport: Decathlon

Trond Høiby (born 24 January 1973) is a retired decathlete from Norway. He set his personal best score (8085 points) on 4 July 1999 at a meet in Herentals. He is a four-time national champion in the men's decathlon (1994-1995-1996-1997).

== Achievements ==
Year	Competition	Venue	Position	Notes
Representing Norway
1999	World Championships	Seville, Spain	DNF	Decathlon
2000	Olympic Games	Sydney, Australia	DNF	Decathlon
