= Jiří Ryba =

Czech decathlete

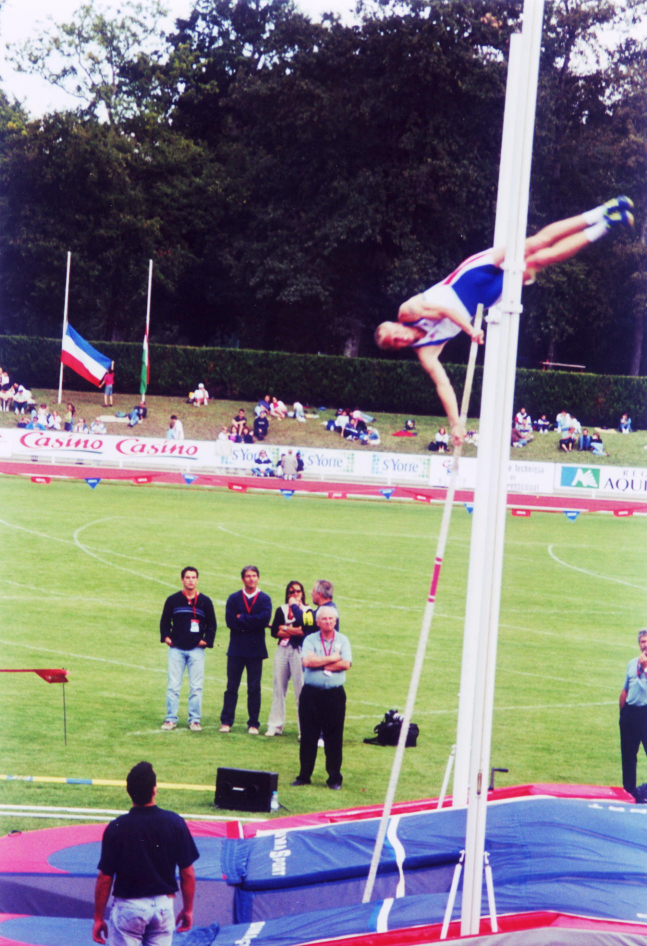
- Ryba in 2001

Personal information
- Born: 15 June 1976 (age 50) Tábor, Czechoslovakia

Sport
- Sport: Decathlon
Medal record
Representing Czech Republic
European Junior Championships
Bronze medal – third place	1995 Nyiregyhaza	Decathlon

Jiří Ryba (Czech pronunciation: [ˈjɪr̝iː ˈrɪba]) (born 15 June 1976) is a former Czech decathlete. His personal best result was 8339 points, achieved in May 2000 in Desenzano del Garda. Ryba is married to pole vaulter Pavla Hamáčková.

== Achievements ==
Year	Competition	Venue	Position	Event	Notes
Representing the Czech Republic
1994	World Junior Championships	Lisbon, Portugal	—	Decathlon	DNF
1995	Hypo-Meeting	Götzis, Austria	25th	Decathlon	7511
1995	European Junior Championships	Nyíregyháza, Hungary	3rd	Decathlon	7271
1996	Hypo-Meeting	Götzis, Austria	15th	Decathlon	7854
1997	European U23 Championships	Turku, Finland	—	Decathlon	DNF
1998	Hypo-Meeting	Götzis, Austria	15th	Decathlon	7885
2000	Olympic Games	Sydney, Australia	14th	Decathlon	8056
2001	World Championships	Edmonton, Canada	6th	Decathlon	8332
2001	Goodwill Games	Brisbane, Australia	6th	Decathlon	7736
2005	Hypo-Meeting	Götzis, Austria	—	Decathlon	DNF

== Football career ==
Following his career in athletics, Ryba became a fitness coach in the Gambrinus liga before moving to 1. FK Příbram as assistant manager. In 2016, he became a fitness coach in the Bahrain national football team alongside Miroslav Soukup and Andrej Kostolansky.
