= Wilfrid Boulineau =

French decathlete

Personal information
- Born: 13 May 1970 (age 56) Rouen, France

Sport
- Sport: Decathlon

Wilfrid Boulineau (born 13 May 1970) is a retired French decathlete. He finished sixth at the 1999 World Championships and twentieth at the 2000 Olympic Games. His personal best result was 8312 points, achieved in May 1999 in Arles.

== Achievements ==
Year	Competition	Venue	Position	Event	Notes
Representing France
1998	European Championships	Budapest, Hungary	18th	Decathlon	
1999	World Championships	Seville, Spain	6th	Decathlon	
2000	Olympic Games	Sydney, Australia	20th	Decathlon	
