= Aki Heikkinen =

Finnish decathlete (born 1980)

Aki Heikkinen (born 24 February 1980 in Vieremä) is a Finnish decathlete. His personal best result was 8188 points, achieved in August 2000 in Lahti.

== Achievements ==
Year	Competition	Venue	Position	Event	Notes
Representing Finland
1998	World Junior Championships	Annecy, France	1st	Decathlon	7476 pts
1999	Hypo-Meeting	Götzis, Austria	14th	Decathlon	7675 pts
1999	European Junior Championships	Riga, Latvia	1st	Decathlon	7881 pts
1999	World Championships	Seville, Spain	15th	Decathlon	7536 pts
1999	IAAF World Combined Events Challenge	several places	13th	Decathlon	
2000	Hypo-Meeting	Götzis, Austria	17th	Decathlon	7831 pts
2001	Hypo-Meeting	Götzis, Austria	—	Decathlon	DNF
