= Dirk-Achim Pajonk =

Dirk Achim Pajonk
Personal information
- Born: March 27, 1969 (age 55); Gelsenkirchen, West Germany
- Height: 6 ft 3 in (191 cm)
- Weight: 176 lb (80 kg)

Sport
- Sport: Decathlon

Dr. Dirk-Achim Pajonk (born March 27, 1969) is a German physician and former athlete.

== Career ==
Dirk Pajonk was eleven years a member of the German national team in the decathlon and started 04 for the TSV Bayer Leverkusen. In 1996 he took part in the Olympic Games in Atlanta, and in 1998 he became a German champion in the decathlon. In the same year he completed his medical studies. He is now attending physician of the German decathlon and Anti-Doping Commissioner of the German decathlete. As of 2004, Pajonk is an orthopedic surgeon in private practice.
