= Chad Smith (athlete) =

American decathlete

Chad Smith (born January 9, 1974, in Ypsilanti, Michigan) is a retired male decathlete from the United States. He set his personal best score (8133 points) in the men's decathlon on May 17, 2002, in Atlanta, Georgia.

== Achievements ==
Year	Competition	Venue	Position	Notes
Representing the United States
2000	Hypo-Meeting	Götzis, Austria	18th	7827
2002	Georgia Tech Invite	Atlanta, Georgia	1st	8133
