= Klaus Isekenmeier =

German decathlete

Klaus Isekenmeier (born 14 April 1975 in Salzkotten-Verne, North Rhine-Westphalia) is a retired German decathlete. His personal best score was 8310 points, achieved in June 1997 in Ratingen.

== Achievements ==
| Year | Competition | Venue | Position | Event | Notes |
Representing Germany
| 1994 | World Junior Championships | Lisbon, Portugal | 2nd | Decathlon | 7298 pts |
| 1996 | Hypo-Meeting | Götzis, Austria | 9th | Decathlon | 8092 pts |
| 1997 | European U23 Championships | Turku, Finland | 1st | Decathlon | 7926 pts |
| 1997 | World Championships | Athens, Greece | 10th | Decathlon | 8180 pts |
| 1998 | Hypo-Meeting | Götzis, Austria | 10th | Decathlon | 8135 pts |
| 1998 | European Championships | Budapest, Hungary | 9th | Decathlon | 8140 pts |
| 1998 | IAAF World Combined Events Challenge | several places | 9th | Decathlon | 24,511 pts |
| 1999 | Hypo-Meeting | Götzis, Austria | 6th | Decathlon | 8274 pts |
| 1999 | World Championships | Seville, Spain | — | Decathlon | DNF |
| 2000 | Hypo-Meeting | Götzis, Austria | — | Decathlon | DNF |
