= David Mewes =

German decathlete (born 1976)

David Mewes (born 7 October 1976) is a retired German decathlete. His personal best score was 8108 points, achieved in June 2000 in Götzis.

== Achievements ==
Year	Tournament	Venue	Result	Extra
1999	Hypo-Meeting	Götzis, Austria	8th	Decathlon
1999	World Championships	Seville, Spain	9th	Decathlon
1999	IAAF World Combined Events Challenge	several places	7th	Decathlon
2000	Hypo-Meeting	Götzis, Austria	12th	Decathlon
