= Lev Lobodin =

Medal record

Men's athletics

Representing Ukraine

European Championships
Bronze medal – third place	1994 Helsinki	Decathlon

Representing Russia

European Championships
Bronze medal – third place	1998 Budapest	Decathlon
Bronze medal – third place	2002 Munich	Decathlon

Lev Alekseyevich Lobodin (Russian: Лев Алексеевич Лободин; born April 1, 1969, in Voronezh) is a male decathlete from Russia, having changed nationality from Ukraine at the end of 1996. His best achievement was the silver medal at the 2003 World Indoor Championships in Birmingham.

== Achievements ==
Year	Competition	Venue	Position	Event	Notes
Representing Ukraine
1993	Hypo-Meeting	Götzis, Austria	6th	Decathlon	8156 pts
1994	Hypo-Meeting	Götzis, Austria	9th	Decathlon	8050 pts
1994	European Championships	Helsinki, Finland	3rd	Decathlon	8201 pts
1995	Hypo-Meeting	Götzis, Austria	11th	Decathlon	8042 pts
1995	World Championships	Gothenburg, Sweden	7th	Decathlon	8196 pts
1996	Hypo-Meeting	Götzis, Austria	4th	Decathlon	8315 pts
1996	Olympic Games	Atlanta, United States	—	Decathlon	DNF
Representing Russia
1997	Hypo-Meeting	Götzis, Austria	7th	Decathlon	8184 pts
1997	World Championships	Athens, Greece	—	Decathlon	DNF
1998	European Indoor Championships	Valencia, Spain	3rd	Heptathlon	6226 pts
1998	Hypo-Meeting	Götzis, Austria	5th	Decathlon	8414 pts
1998	European Championships	Budapest, Hungary	3rd	Decathlon	8571 pts = PB
1998	World Combined Events Challenge	several places	5th	Decathlon	25,275 pts
1999	Hypo-Meeting	Götzis, Austria	3rd	Decathlon	8427 pts
1999	World Championships	Seville, Spain	5th	Decathlon	8494 pts
1999	World Combined Events Challenge	several places	4th	Decathlon	25,059 pts
2000	Olympic Games	Sydney, Australia	13th	Decathlon	8071 pts
2001	World Indoor Championships	Lisbon, Portugal	3rd	Heptathlon	6202 pts
2001	Hypo-Meeting	Götzis, Austria	4th	Decathlon	8465 pts
2001	World Championships	Edmonton, Canada	5th	Decathlon	8352 pts
2001	Goodwill Games	Brisbane, Australia	4th	Decathlon	8227 pts
2002	European Championships	Munich, Germany	3rd	Decathlon	8390 pts
2003	World Indoor Championships	Birmingham, England	2nd	Heptathlon	6297 pts
2003	Hypo-Meeting	Götzis, Austria	—	Decathlon	DNF
2003	World Championships	Paris, France	6th	Decathlon	8198 pts
2004	World Indoor Championships	Budapest, Hungary	3rd	Heptathlon	6203 pts
2004	Hypo-Meeting	Götzis, Austria	6th	Decathlon	8240 pts
2004	Olympic Games	Athens, Greece	—	Decathlon	DNF

== Personal bests ==
- 100 metres - 10.66 (2001)
- 400 metres - 48.39 (1996)
- 1500 metres - 4:29.95 (1991)
- 110 metres hurdles - 13.94 (1999)
- High jump - 2.10 (1991)
- Pole vault - 5.20 (1998, 2001)
- Long jump - 7.56 (1999)
- Shot put - 16.30 (2002)
- Discus throw - 49.44 (2002)
- Javelin throw - 59.00 (1995)
- Decathlon 8571 - (1998)
