= Chris Huffins =

American decathlete (born 1970)

Personal information
- Full name: Christopher Allen Huffins
- Born: April 15, 1970 (age 56) Brooklyn, New York
- Height: 6 ft 2 1/2 in (189 cm)
- Weight: 185 lb (84 kg)
Medal record
Men's Athletics
Representing the United States
Olympic Games
Bronze medal – third place	2000 Sydney	Decathlon
World Championships
Bronze medal – third place	1999 Seville	Decathlon
Goodwill Games
Silver medal – second place	1998 New York City	Decathlon
Pan American Games
Gold medal – first place	1999 Winnipeg	Decathlon
USA Championships
Silver medal – second place	1995	Decathlon
Silver medal – second place	1997	Decathlon
Gold medal – first place	1998	Decathlon
Gold medal – first place	1999	Decathlon
U.S. Olympic Trials
Bronze medal – third place	1996	Decathlon
NCAA Championships
Gold medal – first place	1993	Decathlon

Chris Huffins (born April 15, 1970) is an athlete from the United States who competed in the field of decathlon. He was the director and head coach of the men's and women's track and field and cross country programs at the University of California from 2002 to 2007. He married Monique Parker in 1997 with whom he had one son Zachary. He earned a degree from the University of California in political economies of industrial societies in 2007. Huffins is a member of Alpha Phi Alpha fraternity. He is currently married to Tamika Huffins with whom he had another son, Jaxon.

== Athletic career ==
Chris Huffins first became interested in decathlon while a student at the University of California. Sidelined with a broken toe, he watched other students performing decathlon and decided that that was the sport for him. Before becoming a decathlete, Chris Huffins was also a basketball player, sprinter, and long jumper.

As a decathlete, Huffins acquired a reputation as a fast starter but a slow finisher, prone to surging ahead on the first day of the competition, but fading on the second day. Huffins denied this accusation, saying that it was an accident of ordering because his two weakest events (javelin, 1500m run) happened to be the final two events of the decathlon.

== 2000 Sydney Olympics ==
Leading into the Sydney Games, Huffins established himself as one of the best decathletes in the world. In 1998, he finished second in the Goodwill Games, and in 1999, Huffins won the Pan American Games and finished third at the 1999 World Championships in the decathlon. At the 2000 USA Olympic trials, Huffins finished second behind Tom Pappas and ahead of Kip Janvrin, his future teammates at Sydney.

At the Sydney Olympics, Huffins performed consistently, and after the first nine events, including the javelin, he led eventual winner Erki Nool by 14 points. In the concluding 1500m event, Huffins ran a hard race, beating his previous best time by almost 13 seconds. It was enough to capture the bronze medal. Huffins score was a season's best of 8595 points and only 46 points short of gold medalist Erki Nool.

On the topic of not winning the gold medal, Huffins later said there were as many bronze medals as gold medals, so he didn't feel any less honored for finishing third.

== Coaching career ==
After spending some time as an assistant coach for Wake Forest University in Winston-Salem, North Carolina and Georgia Tech in Atlanta, Georgia, Huffins was hired at his alma mater, the University of California, to coach his old team, the Golden Bears. Under his direction, the team has won 14 All-American honors, set 12 new school records, sent five athletes to the 2004 Summer Olympics, and in 2005, two of Huffin's athletes were ranked in the top 10 in the United States.

On May 29, 2007, Huffins announced his resignation from his position as director of track and field at the University of California.

After brief stints at Boise State University, Eastern Michigan University, the University of Oklahoma and Clemson, he is currently (2014–2015) going into his second year coaching the Purdue Boilermakers.

== Achievements ==
- 1992 Olympic Trials - decathlon - 16th
- 1993 NCAA - decathlon - 1st
- 1993 USA Outdoor Track & Field Championships - decathlon - 9th
- 1993 Pacific-10 Conference, decathlon - 1st
- 1993 Ranked by Track and Field News decathlon - 9th U.S.
- 1995 USA Outdoor Track & Field Championships - decathlon - 2nd
- 1995 1995 World Championships in Athletics Ullevi Stadium, Gothenburg, Sweden - decathlon - 8th
- 1995 Ranked by Track and Field News decathlon - 8th World, 2nd U.S.
- 1996 Olympic Trials - decathlon - 3rd
- 1996 1996 Summer Olympics Atlanta, Georgia, U.S. - decathlon - 10th
- 1996 Ranked by Track and Field News decathlon - 10th World, 3rd U.S.
- 1997 USA Outdoor Track & Field Championships - decathlon - 2nd
- 1997 Ranked by Track and Field News decathlon - 7th World, 2nd U.S.
- 1998 USA Outdoor Track & Field Championships - decathlon - 1st
- 1998 Deca Jam, - decathlon - 1st
- 1998 Goodwill Games, - decathlon - 2nd
- 1998 Ranked by Track and Field News decathlon - 5th World, 2nd U.S.
- 1998 Recipient of the John H. Bennett Award presented by USA Track & Field
- 1999 USA Outdoor Track & Field Championships - decathlon - 1st
- 1999 Pan Am Games - decathlon - 1st
- 1999 World Championships - decathlon - 3rd
- 1999 Recipient of the John H. Bennett Award presented by USA Track & Field
- 2000 Olympic Trials - decathlon - 2nd
- 2000 2000 Summer Olympics Sydney, Australia - decathlon - 3rd
- 2000 Ranked by Track and Field News decathlon - 4th World, 1st U.S.
- 2000 Inducted into the Indiana State Track & Field Hall of Fame
- 2000 Recipient of the John H. Bennett Award presented by USA Track and Field

Huffins holds the heptathlon world best in the 60 m dash with a time of 6.61 seconds.

== Personal bests ==
Information from World Athletics profile unless otherwise noted.

As of May 22, 2024

Event	Performance	Location	Date	Points
Decathlon	8,694 points	New Orleans	June 20, 1998	8,694 points
100 meters	10.22 (+0.9 m/s)	Atlanta	June 21, 1996	1,042 points
Long jump	8.07 m (26 ft 5 1/2 in) (+2.5 m/s) w	Azusa	April 18, 1996	1,079 points
Shot put	16.44 m (53 ft 11 in)	Atlanta	June 21, 1996	878 points
High jump	2.18 m (7 ft 1 3/4 in)	New Orleans	June 19, 1998	973 points
400 meters	48.05	Atlanta	June 21, 1996	907 points
110 meters hurdles	13.82 (+1.5 m/s)	Indianapolis	June 12, 1997	998 points
Discus throw	53.22 m (174 ft 7 1/4 in)	New Orleans	June 20, 1998	938 points
Pole vault	4.90 m (16 ft 3/4 in)	New Orleans	June 12, 1997	880 points
Javelin throw	64.35 m (211 ft 1 1/4 in)	Sevilla	August 25, 1999	803 points
1500 meters	4:38.71	Sydney	September 28, 2000	688 points
Virtual Best Performance				9,186 points
