= Erki Nool =

Estonian decathlete & politician (born 1970)

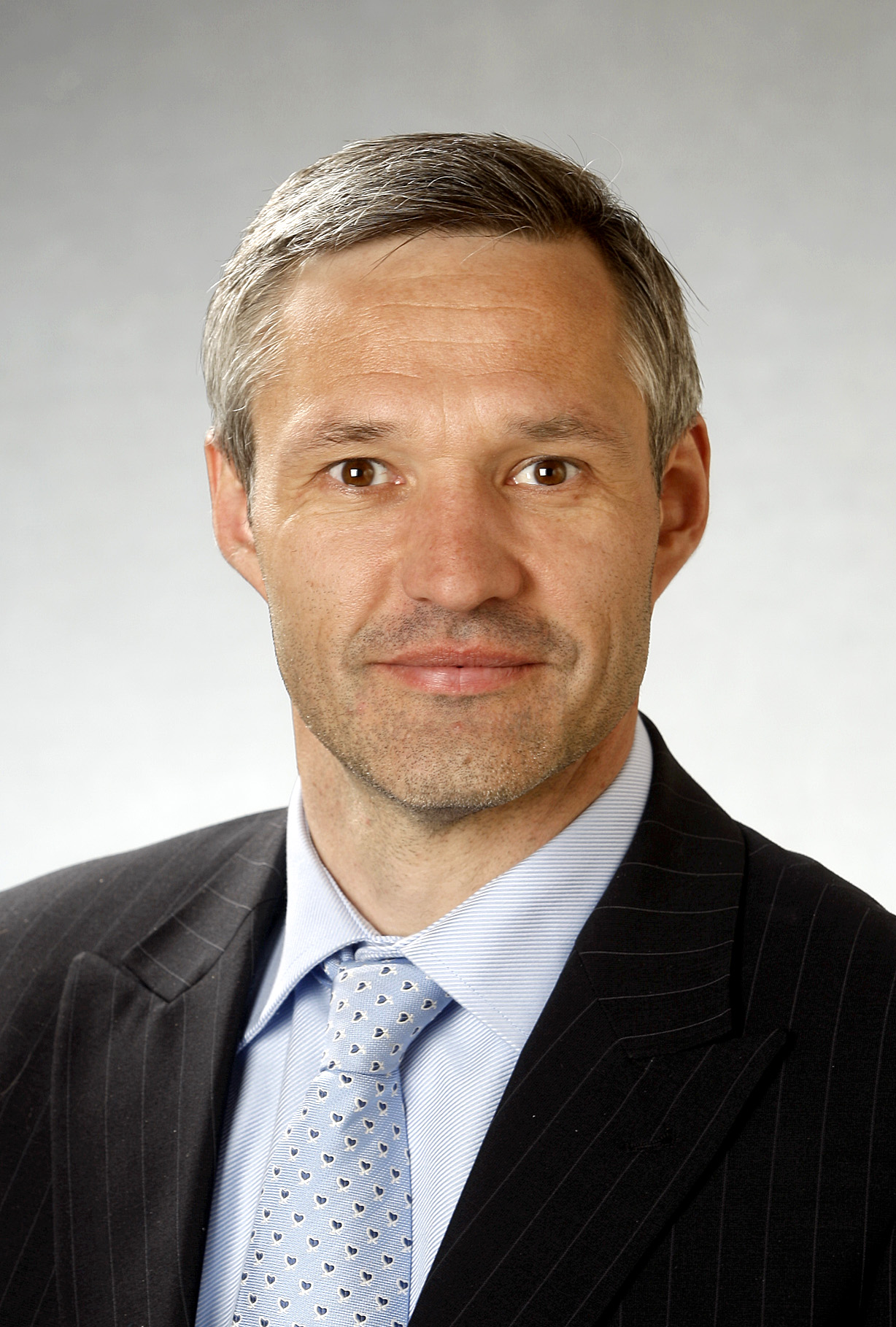
- Nool in 2011

Personal information
- Full name: Erki Nool
- Born: 25 June 1970 (age 56) Võru, then part of Estonian SSR, Soviet Union
- Height: 1.84 m (6 ft 0 in)
- Weight: 84 kg (185 lb)

Sport
- Country: Estonia
- Sport: Track and field
- Event: Decathlon

Achievements and titles
- Personal bests: 8815 NR (Edmonton 2001)
Medal record
Men's athletics
Representing Estonia
Olympic Games
Gold medal – first place	2000 Sydney	Decathlon
World Championships
Silver medal – second place	2001 Edmonton	Decathlon
World Indoor Championships
Silver medal – second place	1997 Paris Bercy	Heptathlon
Silver medal – second place	1999 Maebashi	Heptathlon
European Championships
Gold medal – first place	1998 Budapest	Decathlon
Silver medal – second place	2002 Munich	Decathlon
European Indoor Championships
Gold medal – first place	1996 Stockholm	Heptathlon
Bronze medal – third place	2000 Ghent	Heptathlon
Bronze medal – third place	2002 Wien	Heptathlon

Erki Nool (born 25 June 1970) is an Estonian retired decathlete and former politician.

== Life and career ==
Nool was born on 25 June 1970 in Võru. He grew up in an impoverished environment in the southern part of Võru. His father was a worker in a furniture factory and his mother was in charge of the finances of a school. There were six children, with Erki the third youngest. When he was 13, from the suggestion of his father he moved to a sports-focused boarding school, where he could eat a free warm meal three times a day.

In those days the economy was in a poor condition. When traveling to over-seas competitions, they didn't get their own cabin in the cruise ship, but instead just slept in the hallways and then competed and trained the next day. They also didn't have indoor athletics training facilities for winter. Nool was brought to tears when he was gifted a new, pristine pair of sneakers.

After Estonia regained its independence on 20 August 1991, Nool was vocal about his dream of competing in the Olympics as part of the Estonian team. He took part in the Barcelona 1992 Summer Olympics decathlon but he ended up having to stop and pull out. Little by little he developed and by the mid-1990s he was among the top athletes in decathlon. In September 1997 he founded his own sports club and in 1998–2009 he organized international decathlon competition "Reval Hotels Cup".

When he won gold for decathlon at the 1998 Budapest European Championships, he became a sports hero. Two years later, when he won the gold medal for decathlon in the 2000 Summer Olympics in Sydney, he became a national hero. Although Nool did not place first in any individual event, his total score was the highest. There was a dramatic moment in discus throw, but luckily the competition referee decided to over-rule a judge, who had red-flagged his last and only valid attempt due to alleged step-out. The reinstatement of his 43.66-metre third throw sparked unsuccessful counter-protests from other teams. Nool took gold ahead of the Czech Roman Šebrle and American Chris Huffins.

He has been voted as Estonia's sexiest man and in the 2000s the most popular Estonian. In 2006, Nool participated as a celebrity contestant on the first season of Tantsud tähtedega, an Estonian version of Dancing with the Stars. His professional dancing partner was Ave Vardja.

In 2005–2017, Erki Nool was the Vice Chairman of the EOC Athletes Commission and 2007–2011 member of the European Athletics Development Committee. 2008–2012, he was also member of the executive committee of the Estonian Olympic Committee.

On 4 March 2007, Nool was elected to the Estonian Parliament, the Riigikogu, representing the Union of Pro Patria and Res Publica. He has since left politics and now focuses on his real estate business and athletics school, with 450 students.

His son Robin Nool (born in 1998) competed in pole vault with a record of 5.40 m.

== Achievements ==
Year	Competition	Venue	Position	Event	Result
Representing Estonia
1992	Olympic Games	Barcelona, Spain	—	Decathlon	DNF
1994	European Championships	Helsinki, Finland	10th	Decathlon	7953 pts
1995	World Championships	Gothenburg, Sweden	4th	Decathlon	8268 pts
1995	World Indoor Championships	Barcelona, Spain	7th	Heptathlon	5887 pts
1996	European Indoor Championships	Stockholm, Sweden	1st	Heptathlon	6188 pts
1996	Olympic Games	Atlanta, United States	6th	Decathlon	8543 pts
1997	World Championships	Athens, Greece	6th	Decathlon	8413 pts
1997	World Indoor Championships	Paris, France	2nd	Heptathlon	6213 pts
1998	European Championships	Budapest, Hungary	1st	Decathlon	8667 pts
1998	IAAF World Combined Events Challenge		1st	Decathlon	25,967 pts
1999	World Indoor Championships	Maebashi, Japan	2nd	Heptathlon	6374 pts
1999	World Championships	Seville, Spain	14th	Decathlon	7568 pts
2000	European Indoor Championships	Ghent, Belgium	3rd	Heptathlon	6200 pts
2000	Olympic Games	Sydney, Australia	1st	Decathlon	8641 pts
2000	IAAF World Combined Events Challenge		1st	Decathlon	26,089 pts
2001	World Indoor Championships	Lisbon, Portugal	5th	Heptathlon	6074 pts
2001	World Championships	Edmonton, Canada	2nd	Decathlon	8815 pts
2001	IAAF World Combined Events Challenge		2nd	Decathlon	25,839 pts
2001	Goodwill Games	Brisbane, Australia	3rd	Decathlon	8323 pts
2002	European Indoor Championships	Vienna, Austria	3rd	Heptathlon	6084 pts
2002	European Championships	Munich, Germany	2nd	Decathlon	8438 pts
2003	World Championships	Paris, France	—	Decathlon	DNF
2004	Olympic Games	Athens, Greece	8th	Decathlon	8235 pts
2004	World Indoor Championships	Budapest, Hungary	5th	Heptathlon	6093 pts
2005	European Indoor Championships	Madrid, Spain	12th	Heptathlon	5712 pts

== Personal bests ==
Information from World Athletics profile unless otherwise noted.

As of May 26, 2024

Event	Performance	Location	Date	Points
Decathlon	8,815 points	Edmonton	August 7, 2001	8,815 points
100 meters	10.34 (+3.2 m/s) w	Haapsalu	August 16, 1997	1,013 points
Long jump	8.22 m (26 ft 11 1/2 in) (+3.0 m/s) w	Tallinn	June 15, 1996	1,117 points
Shot put	15.11 m (49 ft 6 3/4 in)	Sydney	September 27, 2000	796 points
High jump	2.05 m (6 ft 8 1/2 in)	Lipetsk	February 9, 1991	850 points
400 meters	46.23	Edmonton	August 6, 2001	997 points
110 meters hurdles	14.37 (-0.1 m/s)	Götzis	June 4, 2000	927 points
Discus throw	45.28 m (148 ft 6 1/2 in)	Arles	June 8, 2003	773 points
Pole vault	5.60 m (18 ft 4 1/4 in)	Tallinn	July 5, 1998	1100 points
Javelin throw	71.91 m (235 ft 11 in)	New York City	July 20, 1998	919 points
1500 meters	4:29.48	Sydney	September 28, 2000	748 points
Virtual Best Performance				9,240 points

Awards and achievements
Preceded by Jüri Jaanson	Estonian Sportsman of the Year; 1996–1998	Succeeded by Andrus Veerpalu
Preceded by Andrus Veerpalu	Estonian Sportsman of the Year; 2000	Succeeded by Andrus Veerpalu
Olympic Games
Preceded by Tõnu Tõniste	Flagbearer for Estonia; 2004 Athens	Succeeded by Martin Padar
