= Mike Maczey =

German decathlete

Mike Maczey (born 28 September 1972) is a retired German decathlete.

He finished seventh at the 1996 European Indoor Championships, ninth at the 1998 European Indoor Championships, eighth at the 1998 European Championships and sixth at the 2002 European Championships. He also competed at the 2000 Olympic Games.

Maczey became German champion in 1997 and 1999. His personal best score was 8461 points, achieved in June 2000 in Götzis.
