= Sébastien Levicq =

French decathlete

Personal information
- Born: 25 June 1971 (age 55) Le Havre, France

Sport
- Sport: Track and field
Medal record
Representing France
Summer Universiade
Gold medal – first place	1993 Buffalo	Decathlon

Sébastien Levicq (born 25 June 1971) is a French decathlete.

== Achievements ==
Year	Competition	Venue	Position	Event	Notes
Representing France
1990	World Junior Championships	Plovdiv, Bulgaria	12th	Decathlon	6832 pts
1993	Hypo-Meeting	Götzis, Austria	17th	Decathlon	7595 pts
1993	World Championships	Stuttgart, Germany	14th	Decathlon	7783 pts
1993	Universiade	Buffalo, United States	1st	Decathlon	7874 pts
1994	Hypo-Meeting	Götzis, Austria	5th	Decathlon	8105 pts
1995	World Indoor Championships	Barcelona, Spain	8th	Heptathlon	5870 pts
1995	Hypo-Meeting	Götzis, Austria	19th	Decathlon	7840 pts
1995	World Championships	Gothenburg, Sweden	9th	Decathlon	8136 pts
1996	European Indoor Championships	Stockholm, Sweden	9th	Heptathlon	5846 pts
1996	Olympic Games	Atlanta, United States	17th	Decathlon	8192 pts
1997	World Indoor Championships	Paris, France	7th	Heptathlon	5865 pts
1997	World Championships	Athens, Greece	—	Decathlon	DNF
1998	Hypo-Meeting	Götzis, Austria	8th	Decathlon	8214 pts
1999	World Championships	Seville, Spain	4th	Decathlon	8524 pts = PB
1999	World Combined Events Challenge	several places	6th	Decathlon	24,248 pts
