= Tomáš Dvořák =

Czech athlete

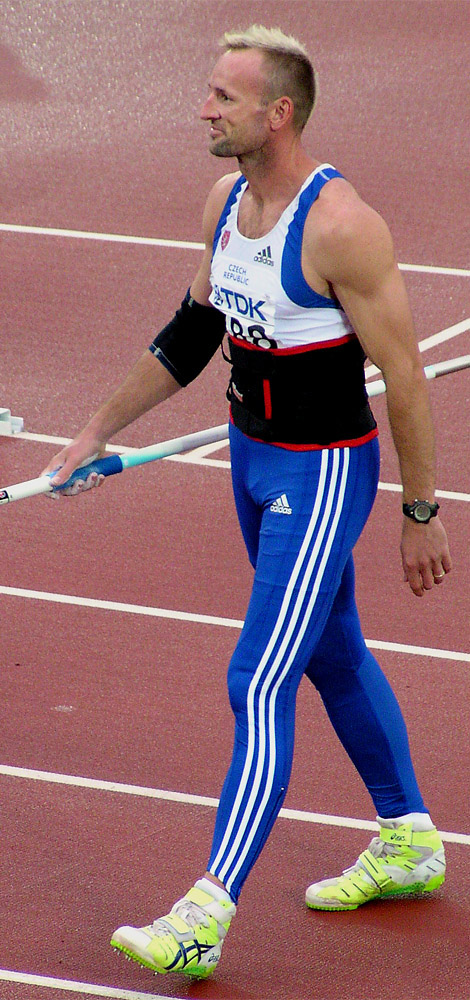
- Tomáš Dvořák

Medal record

Men's athletics

Representing Czech Republic

Olympic Games
Bronze medal – third place	1996 Atlanta	Decathlon

World Championships
Gold medal – first place	1997 Athens	Decathlon
Gold medal – first place	1999 Seville	Decathlon
Gold medal – first place	2001 Edmonton	Decathlon

World Indoor Championships
Silver medal – second place	1995 Barcelona	Heptathlon

European Indoor Championships
Gold medal – first place	2000 Ghent	Heptathlon
Silver medal – second place	1996 Stockholm	Heptathlon
Silver medal – second place	2002 Vienna	Heptathlon

Tomáš Dvořák (Czech pronunciation: [ˈtomaːʃ ˈdvor̝aːk]), born 11 May 1972 in Gottwaldov (now Zlín), Czechoslovakia, is an athlete from the Czech Republic. He competed in the decathlon and heptathlon for the team Dukla Prague. He is a three-time decathlon world champion (1997, 1999, 2001) and a former world record holder (8,994 points scored in Prague, 1999), which is still the fifth best performance of all time. This record was broken by Dvořák's compatriot Roman Šebrle in 2001. Dvořák is the only athlete to score over 8,900 points three times.

Dvořák announced his retirement in July 2008, after he failed to qualify for the Beijing Olympics. He now works as an athletic coach.

== List of results ==
- 1990 CRCJ (Czech Republic Championship of Juniors), Czechoslovakia, heptathlon, 1st
- 1990 WCJ, decathlon, 17th
- 1991 ECJ, decathlon, 2nd
- 1993 WC, Stuttgart (Germany), decathlon, 10th
- 1994 EIC, Paris (France), heptathlon, 4th
- 1994 EC, Helsinki (Finland), decathlon, 7th
- 1995 WIC, Barcelona (Spain), heptathlon, 2nd
- 1995 WC, Göteborg (Sweden), decathlon, 5th
- 1996 EIC, Stockholm (Sweden), heptathlon, 2nd
- 1996 OG, Atlanta (USA), decathlon, 3rd
- 1997 WC Athens, decathlon, 1st
- 1998 Goodwill Games, USA, decathlon, 3rd
- 1998 EIC, Valencia (Spain), heptathlon, 4th
- 1998 EC Budapest (Hungary), decathlon, 5th
- 1999 WC Seville, decathlon, 1st
- 1999 WIC, Maebashi, heptathlon, 4th
- 2000 EIC, heptathlon, 1st
- 2000 OG, Sydney (Australia), decathlon, 6th
- 2001 WC, decathlon, 1st
- 2001 Goodwill Games (Australia), decathlon, 1st
- 2002 EIC, Vienna (Austria), heptathlon, 2nd
- 2003 WIC, Birmingham (UK), heptathlon, 5th
- 2003 CRIC, Bratislava (Slovakia), 60 m hurdles, 1st
- 2003 CRIC, Bratislava (Slovakia), shot put, 3rd
- 2003 WC, Paris (France), decathlon, 4th
- 2004 CRIC, Praha, 60 m hurdles, 3rd, 7,94
- 2004 OG, Athens (Greece), decathlon, DNF
- 2005 WC, Helsinki (Finland), decathlon, 8th
- 2006 EC, Gothenburg (Sweden), decathlon, 12th

== Personal bests ==
Information from World Athletics profile unless otherwise noted.

=== Outdoor ===
As of June 21, 2025

Event	Performance	Location	Date	Points
Decathlon	—N/a	Prague	July 3–4, 1999	8,994 points
100 meters	10.54 (-0.1 m/s)	Prague	July 3, 1999	966 points
Long jump	8.07 m (26 ft 5 1/2 in) (+0.9 m/s)	Edmonton	August 6, 2001	1,079 points
Shot put	16.88 m (55 ft 4 1/2 in)	Prague	May 13, 2000	906 points
High jump	2.09 m (6 ft 10 1/4 in)	Götzis	June 3, 2000	887 points
400 meters	47.56	Athens	August 5, 1997	931 points
110 meters hurdles	13.61 (+0.8 m/s)	Athens	August 6, 1997	1,025 points
Discus throw	50.28 m (164 ft 11 1/2 in)	Turnov	May 21, 2000	876 points
Pole vault	5.00 m (16 ft 4 3/4 in)	Athens	August 6, 1997	910 points
Javelin throw	72.32 m (237 ft 3 in)	Prague	July 4, 1999	925 points
1500 meters	4:27.63	Saint-Denis	August 27, 1993	760 points
Virtual Best Performance				9,265 points

=== Indoor ===
As of June 21, 2025

Event	Performance	Location	Date	Points
Heptathlon	—N/a	Ghent	February 25–26, 2000	6,424 points
60 meters	6.90	Prague	February 15, 1997	918 points
Long jump	7.73 m (25 ft 4 1/4 in)	Prague	February 15, 1997	992 points
Shot put	16.47 m (54 ft 1/4 in)	Valencia	February 28, 1998	880 points
High jump	2.04 m (6 ft 8 1/4 in)	Barcelona	July 2, 1994	840 points
60 meters hurdles	7.76	Prague	February 12, 2000	1,043 points
Pole vault	5.00 m (16 ft 4 3/4 in)	Ghent	February 26, 2000	910 points
1000 meters	2:40.80	Barcelona	March 12, 1995	865 points
Virtual Best Performance				6,448 points

Records
Preceded by (United States) Dan O'Brien	Men's decathlon world record holder 4 July 1999 – 27 May 2001	Succeeded by (Czech Republic) Roman Šebrle
Awards
Preceded by Martin Doktor; Dominik Hašek	Czech Athlete of the Year; 1997; 1999	Succeeded by Dominik Hašek; Jan Železný
Preceded by (United Kingdom) Jonathan Edwards	Men's European Athlete of the Year; 1999	Succeeded by (Czech Republic) Jan Železný
