= 2001 in the decathlon =

This page lists the World Best Year Performance in the year 2001 in the men's decathlon. The main event during this season were the 2001 World Athletics Championships in Edmonton, Alberta, Canada, where the competition started on August 6, 2001, and ended on Tuesday August 7, 2001. Roman Šebrle broke the world record, collecting 9026 points at the 2001 Hypo-Meeting in Götzis, Austria.

== Records ==
Standing records prior to the 2001 season in track and field
World Record	Tomáš Dvořák (CZE)	8994	July 4, 1999	Prague, Czech Republic
Broken records during the 2001 season in track and field
World Record	Roman Šebrle (CZE)	9026	May 27, 2001	Götzis, Austria

== 2001 World Year Ranking ==
Rank	Points	Athlete	Venue	Date	Note
1	9026	Roman Šebrle (CZE)	Götzis, Austria	27/05/2001	WR
2	8902	Tomáš Dvořák (CZE)	Edmonton, Canada	07/08/2001	
3	8815	Erki Nool (EST)	Edmonton, Canada	07/08/2001	
4	8603	Dean Macey (GBR)	Edmonton, Canada	07/08/2001	
5	8465	Lev Lobodin (RUS)	Götzis, Austria	27/05/2001	
6	8408	Oleksandr Yurkov (UKR)	Arles, France	10/06/2001	
7	8371	Attila Zsivoczky (HUN)	Edmonton, Canada	07/08/2001	
8	8332	Jiří Ryba (CZE)	Edmonton, Canada	07/08/2001	
9	8323	Tom Pappas (USA)	Brisbane, Australia	07/09/2001	
10	8307	Stefan Schmid (GER)	Edmonton, Canada	07/08/2001	
11	8280	Laurent Hernu (FRA)	Edmonton, Canada	07/08/2001	
12	8241	Kip Janvrin (USA)	Eugene, United States	22/06/2001	
13	8220	Phil McMullen (USA)	Eugene, United States	22/06/2001	
14	8213	Mário Aníbal (POR)	Kaunas, Lithuania	01/07/2001	
15	8206	Chiel Warners (NED)	Ried, Germany	01/07/2001	
16	8192	Frank Busemann (GER)	Ratingen, Germany	17/06/2001	
17	8169	Bryan Clay (USA)	Eugene, United States	22/06/2001	
17	8169	Michael Nolan (CAN)	Edmonton, Canada	07/08/2001	
19	8153	Benjamin Jensen (NOR)	Talence, France	16/09/2001	
20	8151	Sebastian Knabe (GER)	Ratingen, Germany	17/06/2001	PB
21	8139	Mike Maczey (GER)	Bernhausen, Germany	22/07/2001	
22	8122	Klaus Ambrosch (AUT)	Götzis, Austria	27/05/2001	PB
23	8099	Zsolt Kürtösi (HUN)	Götzis, Austria	27/05/2001	
24	8075	Chad Smith (USA)	Eugene, United States	22/06/2001	
25	8069	Raúl Duany (CUB)	Beijing, PR China	31/08/2001	

== See also ==
- 2001 Hypo-Meeting
