= 2002 in the decathlon =

This page lists the World Best Year Performance in the year 2002 in the men's decathlon. One of the main events during this season were the 2002 European Championships in Munich, Germany, where the competition started on August 7, 2002 and ended on August 8, 2002. Roman Šebrle had broken the world record in the previous year, collecting 9026 points at the 2001 Hypo-Meeting in Götzis, Austria.

== Records ==
Standing records prior to the 2002 season in track and field
| World Record | Roman Šebrle (CZE) | 9026 | May 27, 2001 | Götzis, Austria |

== 2002 World Year Ranking ==
| Rank | Points | Athlete | Venue | Date | Note |
|---|---|---|---|---|---|
| 1 | 8800 | Roman Šebrle (CZE) | Götzis, Austria | 02/06/2002 | |
| 2 | 8583 | Tom Pappas (USA) | Götzis, Austria | 02/06/2002 | |
| 3 | 8509 | Oleksandr Yurkov (UKR) | Götzis, Austria | 02/06/2002 | |
| 4 | 8438 | Erki Nool (EST) | Munich, Germany | 08/08/2002 | |
| 5 | 8433 | Lev Lobodin (RUS) | Ratingen, Germany | 16/06/2002 | |
| 6 | 8390 | Jón Arnar Magnússon (ISL) | Ratingen, Germany | 16/06/2002 | |
| 7 | 8230 | Bryan Clay (USA) | Berkeley, United States | 20 06 2002 | |
| 8 | 8226 | Tomáš Dvořák (CZE) | Ratingen, Germany | 16/06/2002 | |
| 9 | 8192 | Jaakko Ojaniemi (FIN) | Munich, Germany | 08/08/2002 | |
| 10 | 8175 | Attila Zsivoczky (HUN) | Götzis, Austria | 02/06/2002 | |
| 11 | 8163 | Aleksandr Pogorelov (RUS) | Krasnodar, Russia | 24/05/2002 | |
| 12 | 8158 | Mike Maczey (GER) | Munich, Germany | 08/08/2002 | |
| 13 | 8133 | Chad Smith (USA) | Atlanta, United States | 17/05/2002 | |
| 14 | 8122 | Dennis Leyckes (GER) | Berlin, Germany | 01/09/2002 | |
| 15 | 8108 | Laurent Hernu (FRA) | Arles, France | 02/06/2002 | |
| 16 | 8099 | Sebastian Knabe (GER) | Ratingen, Germany | 16/06/2002 | |
| 17 | 8094 | Claston Bernard (JAM) | Baton Rouge, United States | 01/06/2002 | |
| 18 | 8081 | Kristjan Rahnu (EST) | Arlington, United States | 11/05/2002 | |
| 19 | 8041 | Paul Terek (USA) | Baton Rouge, United States | 01/06/2002 | |
| 20 | 8041 | Qi Haifeng (CHN) | Busan, South Korea | 10/10/2002 | |
| 21 | 8023 | Florian Schönbeck (GER) | Ratingen, Germany | 16/06/2002 | |
| 22 | 8008 | Stephen Moore (USA) | Götzis, Austria | 02/06/2002 | |
| 23 | 8007 | Aleksandr Shtepa (RUS) | Krasnodar, Russia | 24/05/2002 | |
| 24 | 7995 | Dmitriy Karpov (KAZ) | Busan, South Korea | 10/10/2002 | |
| 25 | 7989 | Pierre-Alexandre Vial (FRA) | Arles, France | 02/06/2002 | |

== See also ==
- 2002 Hypo-Meeting
