= 2001 Décastar =

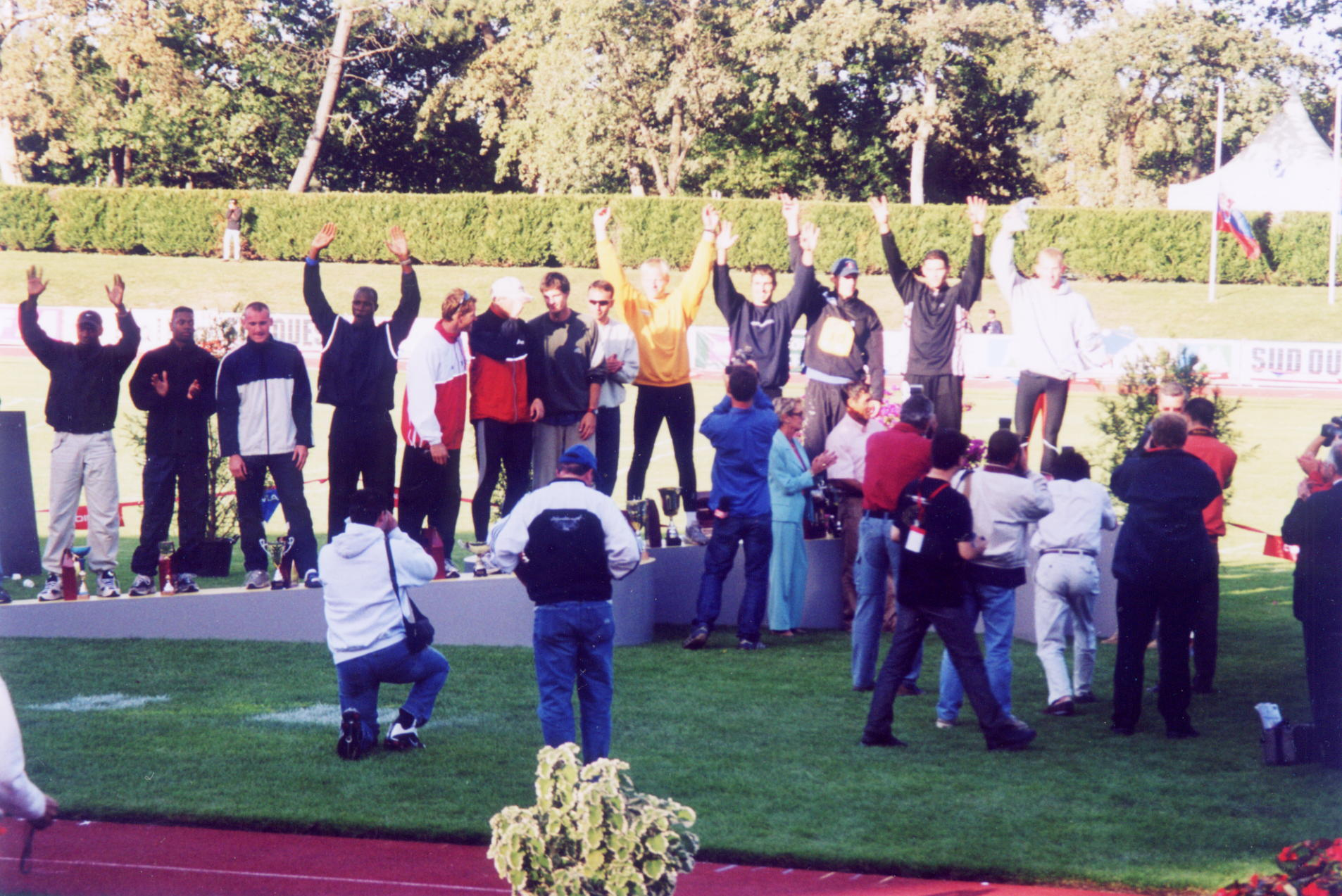
The men's podium

The 2001 Décastar was the 24th edition of the annual two-day track and field meeting for combined track and field events. It took place on 15 September and 16 September 2001 in Talence, France. The competition, featuring a decathlon (men) and a heptathlon (women) event, was part of the 2001 IAAF World Combined Events Challenge.

== Men's decathlon ==
=== Schedule ===
15 September
1. 100 m
2. Long jump
3. Shot put
4. High jump
5. 400 m

16 September
6. 110 m hurdles
7. Discus throw
8. Pole vault
9. Javelin throw
10. 1.500 m

=== Results ===
Rank	Athlete	Decathlon										Points
Rank	Athlete	100	LJ	SP	HJ	400	110 h	DT	PV	JT	1500	Points
1	Oleksandr Yurkov (UKR)	11.06	7.47 m	15.39 m	1.97 m	50.29	14.55	47.89 m	5.25 m	59.18 m	4:34.88	8324
2	Laurent Hernu (FRA)	11.21	7.24 m	13.86 m	2.03 m	49.66	14.27	46.76 m	5.15 m	60.14 m	4:35.74	8213
3	Benjamin Jensen (NOR)	10.75	6.95 m	14.49 m	1.85 m	48.35	14.03	43.45 m	5.15 m	60.38 m	4:35.83	8153
4	Stefan Schmid (GER)	11.05	7.53 m	14.23 m	1.91 m	49.26	14.56	42.96 m	4.95 m	63.44 m	4:42.86	8081
5	Jiří Ryba (CZE)	11.20	6.96 m	13.63 m	2.06 m	49.68	14.62	43.12 m	4.95 m	53.92 m	4:23.68	7968
6	Jan Poděbradský (CZE)	11.01	7.10 m	14.64 m	1.91 m	48.17	14.56	40.34 m	4.75 m	52.35 m	4:17.15	7950
7	Attila Zsivoczky (HUN)	11.30	6.62 m	14.41 m	2.03 m	49.75	15.25	46.03 m	4.75 m	63.33 m	4:31.45	7895
8	Chiel Warners (NED)	10.93	7.32 m	14.04 m	1.91 m	48.29	14.40	42.06 m	4.65 m	55.37 m	4:51.94	7826
9	Klaus Ambrosch (AUT)	11.21	6.81 m	14.56 m	1.85 m	50.07	14.81	43.28 m	4.55 m	68.94 m	4:37.17	7778
10	Bruno Lambèse (FRA)	11.29	6.71 m	15.23 m	1.94 m	50.60	14.68	45.34 m	4.65 m	47.63 m	4:38.87	7591

== Women's heptathlon ==
=== Schedule ===
15 September
1. 100 m hurdles
2. High jump
3. Shot put
4. 200 m

September 16
5. Long jump
6. Javelin throw
7. 800 m

=== Results ===
Rank	Athlete	Heptathlon							Points
Rank	Athlete	100 h	HJ	SP	200	LJ	JT	800	Points
1	Shelia Burrell (USA)	13.06	1.67 m	13.24 m	23.25	6.45 m	48.31 m	2:14.09	6454 pts
2	Yelena Prokhorova (RUS)	13.64	1.85 m	13.16 m	24.63	6.13 m	46.88 m	2:12.12	6354 pts
3	Larissa Netšeporuk (EST)	14.09	1.79 m	13.17 m	25.07	6.06 m	46.62 m	2:18.36	6060 pts
4	Natalya Roshchupkina (RUS)	14.21	1.76 m	14.10 m	24.03	5.65 m	42.18 m	2:09.27	6029 pts
5	Irina Belova (RUS)	14.09	1.70 m	13.39 m	24.79	6.09 m	39.85 m	2:09.27	5996 pts
6	Izabela Obłękowska (POL)	13.70	1.76 m	11.99 m	24.83	6.18 m	41.12 m	2:17.46	5963 pts
7	Marie Collonvillé (FRA)	13.89	1.79 m	11.02 m	25.41	5.98 m	43.30 m	2:14.79	5876 pts
8	Svetlana Kazanina (KAZ)	14.75	1.79 m	13.34 m	25.84	5.90 m	43.70 m	2:16.05	5837 pts
9	Lyudmyla Blonska (UKR)	14.58	1.76 m	12.80 m	25.85	5.98 m	44.74 m	2:48.78	5427 pts
10	Christiane Mendy (FRA)	14.40	1.52 m	10.21 m	25.03	5.51 m	29.72 m	2:34.56	4805 pts
