= Athletics at the 2001 Summer Universiade – Men's decathlon =

The men's decathlon competition at the 2001 Summer Universiade took place on 30 August and 31 August 2001 in Beijing, China.

== Medalists ==
Gold	Raúl Duany; Cuba (CUB)
Silver	Volodymyr Mykhailenko; Ukraine (UKR)
Bronze	Qi Haifeng; PR China (CHN)

== Records ==
World record	Roman Šebrle (CZE)	9026	27 May 2001	Götzis, Austria
Event record	Roman Šebrle (CZE)	8380	30 August 1997	Catania, Italy

== Results ==
The highest mark recorded in each event is highlighted in yellow.

Rank	Athlete	100m	LJ	SP	HJ	400m	110m H	DT	PV	JT	1500m	Points	Notes
1st place, gold medalist(s)	Raúl Duany (CUB)	11.06	7.36	13.76	2.10	49.26	14.54	40.25	4.50	64.23	4:32.95	8069	
2nd place, silver medalist(s)	Volodymyr Mykhailenko (UKR)	11.02	7.33	13.95	2.01	48.49	14.68	41.19	5.00	49.62	4:25.35	8019	
3rd place, bronze medalist(s)	Qi Haifeng (CHN)	11.15	7.27	13.29	1.98	49.19	14.74	46.41	4.70	57.86	4:23.22	8019	
4	Óscar González (ESP)	10.88	7.59	13.17	2.07	48.58	14.36	40.09	4.50	45.98	4:22.69	7949	
5	Romain Barras (FRA)	11.24	7.12	13.53	1.98	49.68	14.33	40.07	4.60	62.78	4:30.10	7876	
6	Indrek Turi (EST)	11.00	6.97	13.56	2.01	50.09	14.83	35.03	4.70	58.22	4:41.27	7628	
7	Klaus Ambrosch (AUT)	11.18	6.80	13.86	1.89	50.16	15.35	41.35	4.50	65.84	4:37.32	7603	
8	Thomas Tebbich (AUT)	11.09	6.99	14.48	1.98	49.42	15.06	40.12	4.30	60.77	4:56.34	7578	
9	Santiago Lorenzo (ARG)	11.19	6.94	14.00	1.89	48.47	15.19	41.56	4.40	55.81	4:36.99	7565	
10	Edson Bindilatti (BRA)	11.11	6.92	11.93	2.10	47.99	14.79	39.82	4.70	40.18	4:36.57	7541	
11	Luiggy Llanos (PUR)	10.83	7.18	13.06	1.92	49.45	14.88	40.27	4.40	55.32	5:20.85	7377	
12	Marti Soosaar (EST)	11.59	6.62	??.??	1.92	50.43	15.58	??.??	?.??	??.??	4:27.84	6792	
13	Bryan Clay (USA)	10.63	7.43	13.38	1.86	51.71	14.77	46.85	?.??	53.91	?:??.??	6791	
14	Anders Black (DEN)	11.30	6.92	13.77	1.92	52.12	??.??	??.??	?.??	??.??	?:??.??	6416	
15	Kim Kun-woo (KOR)	11.38	7.07	??.??	1.83	49.17	15.64	??.??	?.??	??.??	4:17.09	6227	
	Stephen Moore (USA)	10.89	7.38	12.33	2.16	48.16	14.99	??.??	?.??	??.??	–	DNF	
	William Frullani (ITA)	10.68	7.33	13.05	2.01	49.02	14.80	??.??	?.??	??.??	–	DNF	
	Denis Zavyalov (RUS)	11.50	6.85	13.24	1.98	49.91	15.25	??.??	?.??	??.??	–	DNF	
	Pavel Dubitski (KAZ)	11.48	6.89	??.??	2.04	??.??	??.??	??.??	?.??	??.??	–	DNF	
	Egons Lācis (LAT)	11.62	6.47	14.08	NM	DNS	–	–	–	–	–	DNF	
	Jukka Väkeväinen (FIN)	11.18	6.41	12.76	??.??	??.??	??.??	??.??	?.??	??.??	–	DNF	
	Mustafa Taha Hussein (EGY)	11.11	6.57	??.??	??.??	??.??	??.??	??.??	?.??	??.??	–	DNF	
	Chiel Warners (NED)	??.??	??.??	??.??	??.??	??.??	??.??	??.??	?.??	??.??	–	DNF	

== See also ==
- 2001 Decathlon Year Ranking
- 2001 World Championships in Athletics – Men's decathlon
- 2001 Hypo-Meeting
