= 2002 European Athletics Indoor Championships – Men's heptathlon =

The Men's heptathlon event at the 2002 European Athletics Indoor Championships was held on March 2–3.

== Results ==
The highest mark recorded in each event is highlighted in yellow

Rank	Athlete	Nationality	60m	LJ	SP	HJ	60m H	PV	1000m	Points	Notes
1st place, gold medalist(s)	Roman Šebrle	Czech Republic	6.97	7.82	15.62	2.11	7.93	4.80	2:47.69	6280	SB
2nd place, silver medalist(s)	Tomáš Dvořák	Czech Republic	6.92	7.55	16.08	1.90	7.84	5.00	2:46.31	6165	SB
3rd place, bronze medalist(s)	Erki Nool	Estonia	6.91	7.56	14.01	1.96	8.17	5.20	2:45.60	6084	SB
4	Jón Arnar Magnússon	Iceland	7.00	7.51	15.53	1.96	8.24	5.00	2:50.91	5996	SB
5	Attila Zsivoczky	Hungary	7.23	6.99	14.86	2.17	8.51	4.90	2:41.04	5957	SB
6	Zsolt Kürtösi	Hungary	7.10	7.33	15.30	2.05	8.10	4.70	2:48.99	5950	PB
7	Óscar González	Spain	7.09	7.52	12.80	2.11	8.13	4.40	2:42.96	5873	PB
8	Nadir El Fassi	France	7.01	7.02	13.18	2.11	8.37	4.60	2:39.22	5844	PB
9	Mário Aníbal	Portugal	7.08	7.17	14.89	1.99	8.30	4.80	2:47.26	5836	SB
10	Michał Modelski	Poland	7.22	7.03	13.76	2.02	8.30	4.80	2:44.75	5741	
11	Cristian Gasparro	Italy	7.22	7.16	13.66	1.93	8.27	4.90	2:48.97	5677	
12	Klaus Ambrosch	Austria	7.15	7.02	13.94	1.93	8.27	4.70	2:47.63	5638	
13	Francisco José Caro	Spain	7.03	7.25	13.30	1.93	8.68	4.40	3:07.25	5616	
	Laurent Hernu	France	7.12	7.41	14.59	2.05	8.12	DNS	–	DNF	
	Thomas Tebbich	Austria	7.08	6.91	14.07	1.81	DNS	–	–	DNF	
