= 2001 World Championships in Athletics – Men's decathlon =

These are the official results of the men's decathlon competition at the 2001 World Championships in Edmonton, Alberta, Canada. There were a total number of 22 participating athletes, including five non-finishers. The competition started on Monday August 6, 2001 and ended on Tuesday August 7, 2001.

== Medalists ==
Gold	Tomáš Dvořák; Czech Republic (CZE)
Silver	Erki Nool; Estonia (EST)
Bronze	(United Kingdom) Dean Macey; Great Britain (GBR)

== Schedule ==
Monday, August 6
1. 100 m
2. Long Jump
3. Shot Put
4. High Jump
5. 400 m

Tuesday, August 7
6. 110 m hurdles
7. Discus Throw
8. Pole Vault
9. Javelin Throw
10. 1,500 m

== Records ==
Standing records prior to the 2001 World Athletics Championships
World Record	Roman Šebrle (CZE)	9026	May 27, 2001	Götzis, Austria
Event Record	Tomáš Dvořák (CZE)	8837	August 6, 1997	Athens, Greece
Season Best	Roman Šebrle (CZE)	9026	May 27, 2001	Götzis, Austria

== Results ==
The highest mark recorded in each event is highlighted in yellow. These marks were split between six competitors with the gold medallist claiming four of them.

Rank	Athlete	Decathlon										Points
Rank	Athlete	1	2	3	4	5	6	7	8	9	10	Points
1st place, gold medalist(s)	Tomáš Dvořák (CZE)	10.62	8.07	16.57	2.00	47.74	13.80	45.51	5.00	68.53	4:35.13	8902
2nd place, silver medalist(s)	Erki Nool (EST)	10.60	7.63	14.90	2.03	46.23	14.40	43.40	5.40	67.01	4:29.58	8815
3rd place, bronze medalist(s)	Dean Macey (GBR)	10.72	7.59	15.41	2.15	46.21	14.34	46.96	4.70	54.61	4:29.05	8603
4	Attila Zsivoczky (HUN)	10.97	6.99	14.65	2.18	48.86	15.19	47.23	4.90	62.43	4:23.23	8371
5	Lev Lobodin (RUS)	10.74	7.15	16.16	2.03	48.78	14.42	44.95	5.10	54.68	4:31.77	8352
6	Jiří Ryba (CZE)	11.14	7.17	13.76	2.09	48.76	14.33	47.40	5.10	56.04	4:20.66	8332
7	Stefan Schmid (GER)	10.87	7.43	13.55	1.97	47.86	14.57	43.16	5.10	65.13	4:33.98	8307
8	Laurent Hernu (FRA)	10.97	7.31	14.43	2.03	49.31	14.01	43.93	5.10	59.90	4:37.41	8280
9	Oleksandr Yurkov (UKR)	10.93	7.37	15.15	1.97	49.45	14.41	48.10	5.00	58.63	4:38.43	8264
10	Roman Šebrle (CZE)	10.91	7.67	15.43	2.00	48.18	16.97	47.41	4.60	65.75	4:31.04	8174
11	Michael Nolan (CAN)	11.29	6.98	15.17	1.97	49.86	14.86	50.30	4.90	64.57	4:31.44	8169
12	Mário Aníbal (POR)	10.84	7.11	15.35	2.00	48.46	14.45	44.22	5.00	53.23	4:36.64	8155
13	Zsolt Kürtösi (HUN)	11.03	7.17	15.34	2.06	48.68	14.50	45.20	4.70	58.87	4:49.61	8097
14	Benjamin Jensen (NOR)	10.79	7.08	14.47	1.88	48.27	14.22	39.89	5.30	56.51	4:36.45	8090
15	Phil McMullen (USA)	11.39	6.94	15.12	1.97	49.08	15.09	48.85	5.10	53.50	4:20.84	8079
16	Chiel Warners (NED)	10.90	7.48	14.47	1.94	48.28	14.36	44.93	4.30	55.89	4:48.33	7916
17	Kip Janvrin (USA)	11.17	6.72	13.45	1.88	48.26	14.77	43.39	5.00	57.96	4:19.26	7905
—	Sebastian Knabe (GER)	10.90	7.47	14.45	1.97	48.19	DNF	44.36	4.70	49.37	DNS	DNF
—	Bryan Clay (USA)	10.73	7.20	12.79	1.94	49.64	14.53	46.63	NM	DNS	DNS	DNF
—	Jón Arnar Magnússon (ISL)	11.01	5.83	14.78	1.94	DNS	DNS	DNS	DNS	DNS	DNS	DNF
—	Klaus Ambrosch (AUT)	11.07	NM	14.16	1.85	DNS	DNS	DNS	DNS	DNS	DNS	DNF
—	Eduard Hämäläinen (FIN)	11.06	7.13	NM	DNS	DNS	DNS	DNS	DNS	DNS	DNS	DNF

== See also ==
- 2000 Men's Olympic Decathlon
- 2001 Hypo-Meeting
- 2001 Decathlon Year Ranking
- Athletics at the 2001 Summer Universiade - Men's Decathlon
- 2002 Men's European Championships Decathlon
