= 2003 European Athletics U23 Championships – Men's 4 × 100 metres relay =

The men's 4 x 100 metres relay event at the 2003 European Athletics U23 Championships was held in Bydgoszcz, Poland, at Zawisza Stadion on 19 and 20 July.

== Medalists ==
Gold	Tyrone Edgar; Chris Lambert; Darren Chin; Dwayne Grant; United Kingdom
Silver	Daniel Adolia; Fabrice Calligny; David Socrier; Leslie Djhone; France
Bronze	Pieter-Jan Vereecke; François Gourmet; Kristof Beyens; Xavier de Baerdemaeker; Belgium

== Results ==
=== Final ===
20 July

Rank	Nation	Competitors	Time	Notes
1st place, gold medalist(s)	United Kingdom	Tyrone Edgar; Chris Lambert; Darren Chin; Dwayne Grant	39.31	
2nd place, silver medalist(s)	France	Daniel Adolia; Fabrice Calligny; David Socrier; Leslie Djhone	39.38	
3rd place, bronze medalist(s)	Belgium	Pieter-Jan Vereecke; François Gourmet; Kristof Beyens; Xavier de Baerdemaeker	39.54	
4	Sweden	Philip Nossmy; Pontus Nilsson; Johan Wissman; Johan Engberg	39.64	
5	Estonia	Allar Aasma; Henri Sool; Martin Vihmann; Argo Golberg	39.69	
6	Hungary	László Szabó; Dániel Ágoston; Imre Lörincz; Gergely Németh	40.28	
	Czech Republic	Jan Mazanec; Jiří Vojtík; Rudolf Götz; Jan Stokláska	DNF	
	Poland	Marcin Niewiara; Łukasz Chyła; Paweł Ptak; Marcin Jędrusiński	DNF	

=== Heats ===
19 July
Qualified: first 3 in each heat and 2 best to the Final

==== Heat 1 ====
Rank	Nation	Competitors	Time	Notes
1	Belgium	Pieter-Jan Vereecke; François Gourmet; Kristof Beyens; Xavier de Baerdemaeker	39.65	Q
2	France	Daniel Adolia; Ronald Pognon; Fabrice Calligny; David Socrier	39.71	Q
3	Hungary	László Szabó; Dániel Ágoston; Gergely Németh; Dániel Kiss	40.15	Q
4	Spain	Egoitz de Dios; César García; José María García-Borreguero; José Guzmán	40.33	
5	Switzerland	Harry Thonney; Thomas Zaugg; Andreas Oggier; Cédric Nabe	40.72	

==== Heat 2 ====
Rank	Nation	Competitors	Time	Notes
1	Poland	Adam Gaj; Łukasz Chyła; Marcin Niewiara; Paweł Ptak	39.63	Q
2	Estonia	Allar Aasma; Henri Sool; Martin Vihmann; Argo Golberg	39.91	Q
3	United Kingdom	Dwayne Grant; Chris Lambert; Darren Chin; Tim Abeyie	40.02	Q
4	Sweden	Peter Johansson; Pontus Nilsson; Johan Wissman; Johan Engberg	40.19	q
5	Czech Republic	Jan Mazanec; Jiří Vojtík; Rudolf Götz; Jan Stokláska	40.27	q
6	Germany	Tobias Pfennig; Markus Malucha; Johanes Fischer; Benjamin Mielke	40.52	

== Participation ==
According to an unofficial count, 49 athletes from 11 countries participated in the event.

- Belgium (4)
- Czech Republic (4)
- Estonia (4)
- France (5)
- Germany (4)
- Hungary (5)
- Poland (5)
- Spain (4)
- Sweden (5)
- Switzerland (4)
- United Kingdom (5)
