= 2000 European Athletics Indoor Championships – Men's heptathlon =

The men's heptathlon event at the 2000 European Athletics Indoor Championships was held on February 26–27.

== Results ==
The highest mark recorded in each event is highlighted in yellow

Rank	Athlete	Nationality	60m	LJ	SP	HJ	60m H	PV	1000m	Points	Notes
1st place, gold medalist(s)	Tomáš Dvořák	Czech Republic	6.92	7.81	16.82	2.04	7.78	5.00	2:45.68	6424	AR
2nd place, silver medalist(s)	Roman Šebrle	Czech Republic	6.97	7.75	15.47	2.07	7.93	4.80	2:42.51	6271	
3rd place, bronze medalist(s)	Erki Nool	Estonia	6.88	7.72	14.74	1.98	8.27	5.20	2:43.14	6200	SB
4	Attila Zsivoczky	Hungary	7.11	6.84	15.28	2.16	8.49	4.90	2:36.63	6033	PB
5	Mário Aníbal	Portugal	7.06	7.03	15.39	1.98	8.24	4.90	2:42.35	5930	NR
6	Prodromos Korkizoglou	Greece	6.89	6.97	14.61	1.92	8.00	5.00	2:52.73	5855	
7	Chiel Warners	Netherlands	7.01	7.49	14.30	1.92	8.14	4.60	2:46.34	5830	
8	Krzysztof Andrzejak	Poland	7.01	7.25	13.03	2.10	8.44	4.70	2:54.91	5726	
9	Michael Hoffer	Sweden	7.15	7.12	14.48	1.95	8.25	4.80	2:53.37	5688	
10	Yeorgios Andreou	Cyprus	6.96	7.10	13.78	1.98	8.47	4.90	3:05.20	5596	
11	Roland Schwarzl	Austria	7.33	7.26	12.02	1.95	8.36	4.70	2:49.52	5494	
	Jón Arnar Magnússon	Iceland	6.93	7.49	15.87	1.98	8.09	NM	DNS	DNF	
	Wilfrid Boulineau	France	7.16	6.99	13.49	1.98	8.56	DNS	–	DNF	
	Dezsõ Szabó	Hungary	7.13	7.21	13.99	1.98	DNS	–	–	DNF	
	Laurent Hernu	France	DNS	–	–	–	–	–	–	DNS	
