= François Gourmet =

Belgian decathlete (born 1982)

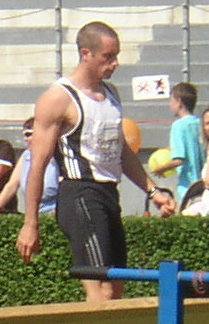
François Gourmet at the 2008 TNT - Fortuna Meeting in Kladno

François Gourmet (born 28 December 1982, in Libramont) is a retired Belgian decathlete. His personal best score is 7974 points, achieved at the 2007 World Championships in Osaka, Japan. He is a former Belgian record holder.

== Achievements ==
Year	Competition	Venue	Position	Event	Notes
Representing Belgium
2003	European U23 Championships	Bydgoszcz, Poland	3rd	4x100 m relay	39.54
2003	Universiade	Daegu, South Korea	11th (sf)	400 m	47.67
2005	European Indoor Championships	Madrid, Spain	10th	Heptathlon	5736 pts
2005	Universiade	İzmir, Turkey	2nd	Decathlon	7792 pts
2005	Décastar	Talence, France	10th	Decathlon	7950 pts
2006	Hypo-Meeting	Götzis, Austria	–	Decathlon	DNF
2006	European Championships	Gothenburg, Sweden	13th	Decathlon	7921 pts
2007	European Indoor Championships	Birmingham, United Kingdom	8th	Heptathlon	5721 pts
2007	World Championships	Osaka, Japan	15th	Decathlon	7974 pts (PB)
2009	Jeux de la Francophonie	Beirut, Lebanon	2nd	Decathlon	7660 pts
