= 2005 European Athletics Indoor Championships – Men's heptathlon =

The Men's heptathlon event at the 2005 European Athletics Indoor Championships was held on March 5–6.

== Medalists ==
Gold	Silver	Bronze
Roman Šebrle; Czech Republic	Aleksandr Pogorelov; Russia	Roland Schwarzl; Austria

== Results ==
=== 60 metres ===
Rank	Heat	Name	Nationality	Time	Points	Notes
1	2	Kristjan Rahnu	Estonia	6.80	955	PB
2	2	Petr Svoboda	Czech Republic	6.90	918	
3	2	François Gourmet	Belgium	6.93	907	
4	1	Chiel Warners	Netherlands	6.98	889	SB
5	2	Aleksandr Pogorelov	Russia	7.03	872	
6	2	Erki Nool	Estonia	7.05	865	
7	2	Roman Šebrle	Czech Republic	7.06	861	SB
8	2	Aleksey Drozdov	Russia	7.08	854	
9	1	Nadir El Fassi	France	7.11	844	SB
10	1	Roland Schwarzl	Austria	7.15	830	PB
11	1	Eugène Martineau	Netherlands	7.15	830	PB
12	1	Laurent Hernu	France	7.15	830	SB
13	1	Marc Magrans	Spain	7.17	823	
14	1	Robert Gindera	Poland	7.19	816	PB
15	1	Attila Zsivoczky	Hungary	7.22	806	SB

=== Long jump ===
Rank	Group	Athlete	Nationality	#1	#2	#3	Result	Points	Notes	Overall
1	B	Roman Šebrle	Czech Republic	7.57	7.55	7.53	7.57	952	SB	1813
2	A	Roland Schwarzl	Austria	7.34	X	7.49	7.49	932	SB	1762
3	B	Kristjan Rahnu	Estonia	7.25	7.46	–	7.46	925	=SB	1880
4	B	Aleksandr Pogorelov	Russia	7.31	X	7.44	7.44	920		1792
5	B	Aleksey Drozdov	Russia	7.38	7.36	7.29	7.38	905		1759
6	A	Chiel Warners	Netherlands	7.37	X	7.37	7.37	903	SB	1792
7	B	Erki Nool	Estonia	6.79	7.26	7.21	7.26	876		1741
8	A	Nadir El Fassi	France	6.84	7.19	7.09	7.19	859		1703
9	B	Laurent Hernu	France	6.80	7.14	7.02	7.14	847		1677
10	A	Eugène Martineau	Netherlands	X	7.13	6.97	7.13	845	SB	1675
11	A	Marc Magrans	Spain	6.77	7.11	X	7.11	840		1663
12	A	François Gourmet	Belgium	7.05	7.10	X	7.10	838		1745
13	A	Attila Zsivoczky	Hungary	7.09	X	6.89	7.09	835	SB	1641
14	A	Robert Gindera	Poland	6.83	X	6.95	6.95	802		1618
	B	Petr Svoboda	Czech Republic				DNS	0		DNF

=== Shot put ===
Rank	Athlete	Nationality	#1	#2	#3	Result	Points	Notes	Overall
1	Aleksandr Pogorelov	Russia	15.59	15.20	16.12	16.12	859	PB	2651
2	Aleksey Drozdov	Russia	15.85	16.05	X	16.05	854		2613
3	Kristjan Rahnu	Estonia	15.04	15.10	15.69	15.69	832		2712
4	Roman Šebrle	Czech Republic	15.27	X	X	15.27	806	SB	2619
5	Laurent Hernu	France	14.93	14.61	X	14.93	785	SB	2462
6	Robert Gindera	Poland	13.31	14.27	14.75	14.75	774	SB	2392
7	Chiel Warners	Netherlands	14.37	13.88	14.67	14.67	769		2561
8	Roland Schwarzl	Austria	14.31	14.67	X	14.67	769	SB	2531
9	Attila Zsivoczky	Hungary	14.11	14.52	14.58	14.58	764		2405
10	Erki Nool	Estonia	13.84	X	13.81	13.84	719		2460
11	Marc Magrans	Spain	13.43	13.23	13.21	13.43	693		2356
12	François Gourmet	Belgium	13.08	13.25	X	13.25	682	SB	2427
13	Eugène Martineau	Netherlands	12.38	13.22	12.11	13.25	681	SB	2356
14	Nadir El Fassi	France	12.93	X	10.39	12.93	663		2366

=== High jump ===
Rank	Group	Athlete	Nationality	1.76	1.79	1.82	1.85	1.88	1.91	1.94	1.97	2.00	2.03	2.06	2.09	2.12	2.15	2.18	Result	Points	Notes	Overall
1	B	Attila Zsivoczky	Hungary	–	–	–	–	–	–	–	–	o	o	o	xxo	xo	xo	xxx	2.15	944	SB	3349
2	B	Aleksandr Pogorelov	Russia	–	–	–	–	–	–	o	–	o	o	o	xxo	xxx			2.09	887	=SB	3538
3	B	Roman Šebrle	Czech Republic	–	–	–	–	–	–	–	o	–	o	o	xxo	xxx			2.09	887	SB	3506
4	A	Eugène Martineau	Netherlands	–	–	–	–	o	–	o	o	o	o	xo	xxx				2.06	859	PB	3215
5	B	Robert Gindera	Poland	–	–	–	–	o	–	o	–	o	o	xxo	xxx				2.06	859	PB	3251
6	A	Nadir El Fassi	France	–	–	–	o	xo	o	o	o	xxo	o	xxx					2.03	831	SB	3197
7	B	Aleksey Drozdov	Russia	–	–	–	–	–	o	xxo	o	o	xxx						2.00	803		3416
8	B	Laurent Hernu	France	–	–	–	–	–	o	o	o	xxo	xxx						2.00	803	SB	3265
9	A	Chiel Warners	Netherlands	–	–	o	–	o	o	o	xxo	xxx							1.97	776	SB	3337
9	A	Roland Schwarzl	Austria	–	–	o	o	o	o	o	xxo	xxx							1.97	776	SB	3307
11	A	François Gourmet	Belgium	o	o	o	xxo	o	xo	o	xxx								1.94	749	PB	3176
12	A	Marc Magrans	Spain	o	–	o	–	o	o	xxx									1.91	723		3079
13	A	Erki Nool	Estonia	–	–	–	–	xo	xo	xxx									1.91	723		3183
	B	Kristjan Rahnu	Estonia	–	–	–	–	xxx											NM	0		2712

=== 60 metres hurdles ===
Rank	Heat	Name	Nationality	Time	Points	Notes	Overall
1	2	Chiel Warners	Netherlands	7.94	997	SB	4334
2	2	Laurent Hernu	France	8.04	972	SB	4237
3	2	Aleksandr Pogorelov	Russia	8.08	962	SB	4500
4	2	Roland Schwarzl	Austria	8.16	942	=PB	4249
5	2	Roman Šebrle	Czech Republic	8.17	939	SB	4445
6	1	Attila Zsivoczky	Hungary	8.28	913	PB	4262
7	1	Nadir El Fassi	France	8.32	903		4100
8	1	Robert Gindera	Poland	8.34	898	PB	4149
9	1	Eugène Martineau	Netherlands	8.37	891	PB	4106
10	1	Marc Magrans	Spain	8.38	888		3967
11	1	Erki Nool	Estonia	8.39	886		4069
12	2	Aleksey Drozdov	Russia	8.48	865		4281
13	1	François Gourmet	Belgium	8.56	846		4022
	1	Kristjan Rahnu	Estonia	DNS	DNF		

=== Pole vault ===
Rank	Group	Athlete	Nationality	4.20	4.30	4.40	4.50	4.60	4.70	4.80	4.90	5.00	5.10	5.20	5.30	Result	Points	Notes	Overall
1	B	Roland Schwarzl	Austria	–	–	–	–	o	–	o	o	o	xo	xxo	xxx	5.20	972	PB	5221
2	B	Erki Nool	Estonia	–	–	–	–	–	–	–	–	–	o	–	xxx	5.10	941		5010
3	B	Aleksandr Pogorelov	Russia	–	–	–	–	o	–	xo	o	o	xxx			5.00	910	PB	5410
4	A	Roman Šebrle	Czech Republic	–	–	o	–	o	–	o	–	xo	xxx			5.00	910	SB	5355
5	A	Chiel Warners	Netherlands	–	–	xo	–	xo	o	o	xo	xxx				4.90	880	SB	5214
6	A	Attila Zsivoczky	Hungary	–	–	–	o	xo	xo	o	xxx					4.80	849	SB	5111
7	B	François Gourmet	Belgium	–	–	–	–	o	–	xo	–	xxx				4.80	849		4871
8	A	Aleksey Drozdov	Russia	xo	xo	xo	o	o	xxo	xxx						4.70	819		5100
9	A	Robert Gindera	Poland	–	o	–	o	o	xxx							4.60	790		4939
9	A	Eugène Martineau	Netherlands	–	–	o	–	o	xxx							4.60	790		4896
9	B	Marc Magrans	Spain	–	–	–	–	o	–	xxx						4.60	790		4757
12	B	Laurent Hernu	France	–	–	–	–	xxo	x–	x						4.60	790		5027
13	B	Nadir El Fassi	France	o	o	xo	xxx									4.40	731		4831

=== 1000 metres ===
Rank	Name	Nationality	Time	Points	Notes
1	Nadir El Fassi	France	2:36.31	915	PB
2	Attila Zsivoczky	Hungary	2:36.49	913	
3	Marc Magrans	Spain	2:36.53	912	SB
4	Roman Šebrle	Czech Republic	2:39.64	877	SB
5	Eugène Martineau	Netherlands	2:40.29	870	
6	François Gourmet	Belgium	2:40.80	865	
7	Laurent Hernu	France	2:42.27	848	
8	Roland Schwarzl	Austria	2:42.76	843	PB
9	Chiel Warners	Netherlands	2:42.90	841	SB
10	Aleksey Drozdov	Russia	2:43.17	839	PB
11	Robert Gindera	Poland	2:47.86	788	PB
12	Erki Nool	Estonia	2:56.19	702	
13	Aleksandr Pogorelov	Russia	2:56.32	701	

=== Final results ===
The highest mark recorded in each event is highlighted in yellow

Rank	Athlete	Nationality	60m	LJ	SP	HJ	60m H	PV	1000m	Points	Notes
1st place, gold medalist(s)	Roman Šebrle	Czech Republic	7.06	7.57	15.27	2.09	8.17	5.00	2:39.64	6232	WL
2nd place, silver medalist(s)	Aleksandr Pogorelov	Russia	7.03	7.44	16.12	2.09	8.08	5.00	2:56.32	6111	
3rd place, bronze medalist(s)	Roland Schwarzl	Austria	7.15	7.49	14.67	1.97	8.16	5.20	2:42.76	6064	NR
4	Chiel Warners	Netherlands	6.98	7.37	14.67	1.97	7.94	4.90	2:42.90	6055	SB
5	Attila Zsivoczky	Hungary	7.22	7.09	14.58	2.15	8.28	4.80	2:36.49	6024	
6	Aleksey Drozdov	Russia	7.08	7.38	16.05	2.00	8.48	4.70	2:43.17	5939	
7	Laurent Hernu	France	7.15	7.14	14.93	2.00	8.04	4.60	2:42.27	5875	SB
8	Eugène Martineau	Netherlands	7.15	7.13	13.22	2.06	8.37	4.60	2:40.29	5766	PB
9	Nadir El Fassi	France	7.11	7.19	12.93	2.03	8.32	4.40	2:36.31	5746	SB
10	François Gourmet	Belgium	6.93	7.10	13.25	1.94	8.56	4.80	2:40.80	5736	
11	Robert Gindera	Poland	7.19	6.95	14.75	2.06	8.34	4.60	2:47.86	5727	
12	Erki Nool	Estonia	7.05	7.26	13.84	1.91	8.39	5.10	2:56.19	5712	
13	Marc Magrans	Spain	7.17	7.11	13.43	1.91	8.38	4.60	2:36.53	5669	
	Kristjan Rahnu	Estonia	6.80	7.46	15.69	NM	DNS	–	–	DNF	
	Petr Svoboda	Czech Republic	6.90	DNS	–	–	–	–	–	DNF	
