= 1996 World Junior Championships in Athletics – Men's decathlon =

The men's decathlon event at the 1996 World Junior Championships in Athletics was held in Sydney, Australia, at International Athletic Centre on 21 and 22 August. Senior implements (106.7 cm (3'6) hurdles, 7257g shot, 2 kg discus) were used.

== Medalists ==
Gold	Attila Zsivoczky; Hungary
Silver	Dean Macey; United Kingdom
Bronze	Chiel Warners; Netherlands

== Results ==
=== Final ===
21/22 August

The highest mark recorded in each event is highlighted in yellow

Rank	Name	Nationality	100m	LJ	SP	HJ	400m	110m H	DT	PV	JT	1500m	Points	Notes
1st place, gold medalist(s)	Attila Zsivoczky	Hungary	11.54 (w: -1.0 m/s)	7.20	13.83	2.15	51.18	15.88 (w: -0.7 m/s)	43.80	4.40	53.80	4:38.55	7582	
2nd place, silver medalist(s)	Dean Macey	United Kingdom	11.33 (w: 1.1 m/s)	7.06	12.74	2.00	50.41	15.01 (w: -0.1 m/s)	40.46	4.20	63.30	4:48.11	7480	
3rd place, bronze medalist(s)	Chiel Warners	Netherlands	11.11 (w: 1.1 m/s)	7.07	12.65	1.94	48.85	15.11 (w: -0.1 m/s)	36.14	4.30	53.36	4:40.63	7368	
4	Štěpán Janáček	Czech Republic	11.52 (w: -1.0 m/s)	6.89	11.75	2.00	50.87	15.50 (w: -0.7 m/s)	35.28	5.10	43.32	4:24.49	7276	
5	Bart Bennema	Netherlands	11.01 (w: -1.0 m/s)	6.82	12.97	1.94	49.52	14.31 (w: -0.7 m/s)	36.44	4.20	48.78	5:06.10	7177	
6	James Fitzpatrick	Australia	11.05 (w: 1.1 m/s)	7.03	12.53	1.97	49.62	15.56 (w: -0.1 m/s)	33.72	4.50	49.00	4:54.38	7166	
7	Aleksander Chtepa	Russia	11.58 (w: 1.1 m/s)	6.68	11.51	1.97	50.65	15.81 (w: -0.7 m/s)	37.32	4.50	51.36	4:31.06	7084	
8	Gerd Brinkmann	Germany	11.39 (w: -1.0 m/s)	6.57	13.35	1.85	51.16	15.78 (w: -0.7 m/s)	39.04	4.40	53.98	4:39.86	7073	
9	Gregor Kovacic	Slovenia	11.31 (w: -1.0 m/s)	4.52	13.72	2.00	51.47	14.51 (w: -0.7 m/s)	39.66	4.60	56.02	4:51.38	6995	
10	Mika Lönnblad	Finland	11.56 (w: 1.1 m/s)	6.71	14.16	1.79	52.67	15.36 (w: -0.1 m/s)	41.62	4.20	59.08	5:02.07	6989	
11	Dmitriy Ivanov	Russia	11.31 (w: 0.7 m/s)	6.98	11.35	1.82	51.87	15.59 (w: -0.1 m/s)	35.76	4.60	48.32	4:38.28	6947	
12	Thomas Weiler	Austria	11.30 (w: 1.1 m/s)	6.66	12.56	2.00	51.29	15.47 (w: -0.1 m/s)	33.80	4.50	40.88	4:54.82	6867	
13	Harri Laiho	Finland	11.40 (w: 0.7 m/s)	6.54	11.74	1.82	52.10	16.44 (w: 0.3 m/s)	41.24	4.70	55.34	5:07.89	6807	
14	Pierre Friteyre	France	11.38 (w: 0.7 m/s)	6.90	11.96	1.82	52.89	15.72 (w: 0.3 m/s)	35.36	4.40	54.12	4:59.57	6781	
15	Tong Haibin	China	11.50 (w: 1.1 m/s)	7.14	12.54	1.82	54.11	15.52 (w: 0.3 m/s)	35.94	4.30	54.96	5:08.21	6768	
16	Bevan Hart	United States	11.39 (w: 0.7 m/s)	6.70	11.15	1.85	51.30	16.34 (w: 0.3 m/s)	33.18	4.70	44.34	4:38.69	6733	
17	Franz Petter	Austria	11.08 (w: 0.7 m/s)	6.45	11.41	1.82	51.60	15.54 (w: 0.3 m/s)	36.34	4.10	44.82	5:12.51	6509	
18	Adrian Krebs	Switzerland	11.20 (w: 0.7 m/s)	7.06	12.18	1.91	49.44	15.09 (w: 0.3 m/s)	29.08	DNF	56.08	4:44.39	6443	
19	Theódoros Kosmidis	Greece	11.79 (w: 0.7 m/s)	6.36	11.21	1.85	53.73	18.59 (w: 0.3 m/s)	35.34	4.00	46.28	5:52.63	5724	
	David Wagner	Germany	11.17 (w: -1.0 m/s)	NM	DNS	DNS	DNS	DNS	DNS	DNS	DNS	DNS	DNF	

== Participation ==
According to an unofficial count, 20 athletes from 15 countries participated in the event.

- Australia (1)
- Austria (2)
- China (1)
- Czech Republic (1)
- Finland (2)
- France (1)
- Germany (2)
- Greece (1)
- Hungary (1)
- Netherlands (2)
- Russia (2)
- Slovenia (1)
- Switzerland (1)
- United Kingdom (1)
- United States (1)
