= 2002 European Athletics Championships – Men's decathlon =

Men's decathlon at the European Athletics Championships

The men's decathlon competition at the 2002 European Athletics Championships was held on 7 August and 8 August 2002 in Munich, Germany.

== Medalists ==
Gold	Roman Šebrle; Czech Republic (CZE)
Silver	Erki Nool; Estonia (EST)
Bronze	Lev Lobodin; Russia (RUS)

== Schedule ==
7 August
1. 100 m
2. Long jump
3. Shot put
4. High jump
5. 400 m

8 August
6. 110 m hurdles
7. Discus throw
8. Pole vault
9. Javelin throw
10. 1,500 m

== Records ==
World record	Roman Šebrle (CZE)	9026	27 May 2001	Götzis, Austria
European record	Roman Šebrle (CZE)	9026	27 May 2001	Götzis, Austria

== Results ==
The highest mark recorded in each event is highlighted in yellow.

Rank	Name	100m	LJ	SP	HJ	400m	110m H	DT	PV	JT	1500m	Points
1st place, gold medalist(s)	Roman Šebrle (CZE)	10.83	7.92	15.41	2.12	48.48	14.04	46.88	5.10	68.51	4:42.94	8800
2nd place, silver medalist(s)	Erki Nool (EST)	10.75	7.49	14.76	2.00	47.26	14.63	45.05	5.30	59.52	4:41.95	8438
3rd place, bronze medalist(s)	Lev Lobodin (RUS)	10.88	7.17	16.12	2.03	49.50	14.25	48.93	5.20	56.34	4:40.80	8390
4	Jón Arnar Magnússon (ISL)	10.96	7.48	16.14	2.00	48.80	14.61	45.12	4.90	63.96	4:59.95	8238
5	Jaakko Ojaniemi (FIN)	10.58	7.56	15.37	1.97	49.31	14.75	44.29	4.40	66.63	4:44.94	8192
6	Mike Maczey (GER)	11.17	7.43	14.35	2.06	51.04	14.54	43.84	5.10	63.75	4:43.75	8158
7	Laurent Hernu (FRA)	11.22	7.32	13.18	2.00	49.33	14.35	45.84	4.90	58.56	4:35.25	8051
8	Aleksandr Pogorelov (RUS)	11.15	7.63	14.76	2.09	51.28	14.37	42.03	4.90	58.03	4:56.15	8016
9	William Frullani (ITA)	10.59	7.27	13.81	2.12	48.81	14.37	40.47	4.40	50.79	4:53.57	7863
10	Paolo Casarsa (ITA)	11.27	7.01	15.13	1.91	51.37	14.50	42.72	4.80	66.16	4:52.35	7807
11	Zsolt Kürtösi (HUN)	11.07	6.93	15.08	1.97	50.23	14.62	46.25	4.60	58.32	4:53.58	7806
12	Klaus Ambrosch (AUT)	11.09	6.69	13.77	1.88	49.73	14.74	42.11	4.70	67.67	4:42.51	7746
13	Marzio Viti (ITA)	11.45	7.37	14.37	1.94	52.49	15.29	46.56	4.90	53.38	4:48.10	7632
14	Jukka Väkeväinen (FIN)	11.12	7.16	13.16	1.97	48.75	15.22	38.29	4.70	50.02	4:31.93	7605
15	Rolf Schläfli (SUI)	11.38	6.76	14.31	1.91	50.13	15.18	44.12	4.50	63.56	4:53.05	7543
16	Sebastian Knabe (GER)	11.06	7.44	14.15	2.00	48.65	14.37	42.97	—	52.50	4:57.80	7036
—	Tomáš Dvořák (CZE)	10.96	7.39	15.52	1.94	49.97	14.34	44.38	—	—	—	DNF
—	Oleksandr Yurkov (UKR)	11.19	7.53	14.64	1.97	52.23	15.00	45.31	—	—	—	DNF
—	Krzysztof Andrzejak (POL)	11.20	7.05	14.14	2.03	49.74	15.41	—	—	—	—	DNF
—	Eugène Martineau (NED)	11.32	6.71	12.67	1.91	50.34	—	—	—	—	—	DNF
—	Benjamin Jensen (NOR)	—	—	—	—	—	—	—	—	—	—	DNS
—	Óscar González (ESP)	—	—	—	—	—	—	—	—	—	—	DNS

== See also ==
- 2001 World Championships in Athletics – Men's decathlon
- 2002 Hypo-Meeting
- 2002 Decathlon Year Ranking
- 2003 World Championships in Athletics – Men's decathlon
