= Luiggy Llanos =

Puerto Rican decathlete

Personal information
- Born: August 22, 1978 (age 47) Río Piedras, Puerto Rico

Sport
- Sport: Track and field
Medal record
Athletics
Representing Puerto Rico
Pan American Games
Silver medal – second place	2003 Santo Domingo	Decathlon
CAC Junior Championships (U17)
Bronze medal – third place	1994 Port of Spain	400 m

Luiggy Llanos Cruz (born August 22, 1978) is a male decathlete from Puerto Rico.

== Biography ==
He set his personal best (7704 points) at the 2003 Pan American Games in Santo Domingo, Dominican Republic, where he claimed the silver medal.

== Achievements ==
Year	Competition	Venue	Position	Event	Notes
Representing Puerto Rico
1994	Central American and Caribbean Junior Championships (U-17)	Port of Spain, Trinidad and Tobago	3rd	400 m	49.5
2001	Hypo-Meeting	Götzis, Austria	14th	Decathlon	7613 pts
2001	Central American and Caribbean Championships	Guatemala City, Guatemala	2nd	Decathlon	7272 pts A
2001	Summer Universiade	Beijing, PR China	11th	Decathlon	7377 pts
2002	Central American and Caribbean Games	San Salvador, El Salvador	8th	Javelin	61.32 m
2003	Pan American Games	Santo Domingo, Dominican Republic	2nd	Decathlon	7704 pts NR
2004	Olympic Games	Athens, Greece	—	Decathlon	DNF
