= Nadir El Fassi =

French decathlete

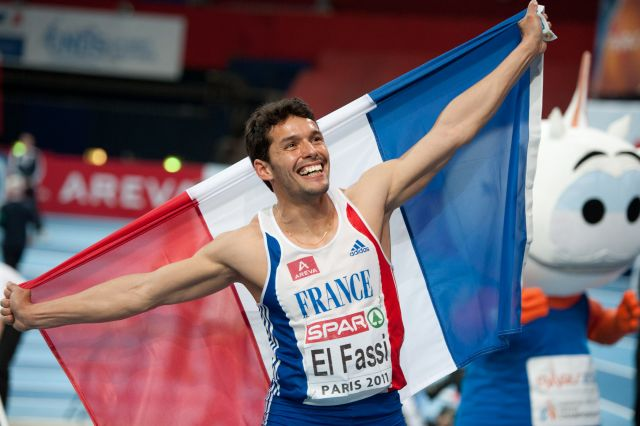
Nadir El Fassi at the 2011 European Indoor Championships.

Nadir El Fassi (born 23 September 1983 in Perpignan) is a French decathlete.

== Achievements ==
| Year | Competition | Venue | Position | Event | Notes |
Representing France
| 2002 | European Indoor Championships | Vienna, Austria | 8th | Heptathlon | 5844 pts |
| 2002 | World Junior Championships | Kingston, Jamaica | 2nd | Decathlon (junior) | 7677 pts |
| 2005 | European Indoor Championships | Madrid, Spain | 9th | Heptathlon | 5746 pts |
| 2005 | European U23 Championships | Erfurt, Germany | 7th | Decathlon | 7562 pts |
| 2005 | Universiade | İzmir, Turkey | 3rd | Decathlon | 7724 pts |
| 2005 | Jeux de la Francophonie | Niamey, Niger | 2nd | Decathlon | 7307 pts |
| 2006 | European Championships | Gothenburg, Sweden | 16th | Decathlon | 7604 pts |
| 2009 | World Championships | Berlin, Germany | 22nd | Decathlon | 7922 pts |
| 2010 | European Championships | Barcelona, Spain | 12th | Decathlon | 7906 pts |
| 2011 | European Indoor Championships | Paris, France | 2nd | Heptathlon | 6237 pts |
