= 1999 European Athletics U23 Championships – Men's decathlon =

The men's decathlon event at the 1999 European Athletics U23 Championships was held in Gothenburg, Sweden, at Ullevi on 29 and 30 July 1999.

== Medalists ==
Gold	Attila Zsivoczky; Hungary
Silver	Boris Kawohl; Germany
Bronze	Dmitriy Ivanov; Russia

== Results ==
=== Final ===
29-30 July

The highest mark recorded in each event is highlighted in yellow

Rank	Name	Nationality	100m	LJ	SP	HJ	400m	110m H	DT	PV	JT	1500m	Points	Notes
1st place, gold medalist(s)	Attila Zsivoczky	Hungary	11.19 (w: -0.1 m/s)	7.31 (w: 0.5 m/s)	14.88	2.19	48.37	15.09 (w: 1.1 m/s)	45.48	4.80	60.63	4:20.94	8379	CR
2nd place, silver medalist(s)	Boris Kawohl	Germany	11.33 (w: 0.3 m/s)	7.11 (w: 1.9 m/s)	12.33	1.95	49.58	14.80 (w: 1.1 m/s)	43.06	4.80	57.36	4:18.79	7815	
3rd place, bronze medalist(s)	Dmitriy Ivanov	Russia	10.98 (w: -0.1 m/s)	7.04 (w: 0.7 m/s)	12.96	1.95	48.76	14.83	41.97	4.60	54.72	4:24.84	7787	
4	Henri Kokkonen	Finland	11.26 (w: 0.3 m/s)	7.40 (w: 1.4 m/s)	13.77	1.98	50.44	14.83 (w: 1.1 m/s)	41.29	4.60	57.61	4:36.98	7759	
5	Tomáš Komenda	Czech Republic	11.16 (w: -0.1 m/s)	6.890.4	12.67	2.04	50.42	15.13	38.23	4.90	52.24	4:37.54	7556	
6	Andre Röttger	Germany	11.35 (w: 0.3 m/s)	7.35 w (w: 2.1 m/s)	12.05	1.92	49.26	15.47 (w: 1.1 m/s)	36.74	4.30	63.53	4:22.03	7555	
7	Adrian Krebs	Switzerland	10.86 (w: -0.1 m/s)	7.00 (w: 0.6 m/s)	13.46	1.86	48.93	15.02	35.34	4.50	55.70	4:35.89	7501	
8	Jurren Valkenburg	Netherlands	10.95 (w: -0.1 m/s)	6.95 (w: 0.7 m/s)	13.42	1.86	49.48	15.39	40.30	4.40	57.23	4:43.18	7446	
9	Agustín Capella	Spain	11.33 (w: 0.3 m/s)	7.33 (w: 0.4 m/s)	12.77	1.92	52.29	14.77	41.54	5.00	47.25	4:58.90	7376	
10	Sebastian Knabe	Germany	11.33 (w: 0.3 m/s)	7.09 (w: 1.8 m/s)	12.68	2.04	49.18	14.79	39.58	4.20	48.49	4:47.89	7366	
	Chiel Warners	Netherlands	10.77 (w: -0.1 m/s)	7.43 (w: -1.3 m/s)	13.90	1.98	47.31	14.41	41.85	NM			DNF	
	Dean Macey	Great Britain	10.90 (w: 0.3 m/s)	7.51 (w: 1.3 m/s)	14.27	2.10	48.25	DNF					DNF	
	Frank Peeters	Netherlands	11.25 (w: -0.1 m/s)	6.65 (w: 0.4 m/s)	11.73	1.83	49.97						DNF	

== Participation ==
According to an unofficial count, 13 athletes from 9 countries participated in the event.

- Czech Republic (1)
- Finland (1)
- Germany (3)
- Great Britain (1)
- Hungary (1)
- Netherlands (3)
- Russia (1)
- Spain (1)
- Switzerland (1)
