= Volodymyr Mykhailenko =

Ukrainian decathlete

Personal information
- Born: 27 August 1973 (age 53) Dnipro, Soviet Union

Sport
- Sport: Decathlon
Medal record
Representing Ukraine
Summer Universiade
Silver medal – second place	2001 Beijing	Decathlon

Volodymyr Oleksiyovych Mykhailenko (Ukrainian: Володимир Олексійович Михайленко; born 27 August 1973) is a retired male decathlete from Ukraine, best known for winning the silver medal in the men's decathlon at the 2001 Summer Universiade.

== Achievements ==
Year	Competition	Venue	Position	Notes
Representing Ukraine
2000	Olympic Games	Sydney, Australia	22nd	Decathlon
2001	Summer Universiade	Beijing, PR China	2nd	Decathlon
