= 2002 World Junior Championships in Athletics – Men's decathlon =

The men's decathlon event at the 2002 World Junior Championships in Athletics was held in Kingston, Jamaica, at National Stadium on 16 and 17 July. Junior implements (valid until 2005) were used, i.e. 106.7 cm (3'6) (senior implement) hurdles, as well as 6 kg shot and 1.75 kg discus.

== Medalists ==
Gold	Leonid Andreyev; Uzbekistan
Silver	Nadir El Fassi; France
Bronze	Mikko Halvari; Finland

== Results ==
=== Final ===
16/17 July

The highest mark recorded in each event is highlighted in yellow

Rank	Name	Nationality	100m	LJ	SP	HJ	400m	110m H	DT	PV	JT	1500m	Points
1st place, gold medalist(s)	Leonid Andreyev	Uzbekistan	10.97 (w: 1.8 m/s)	6.96	14.85	2.10	50.95	15.11 (w: 0.3 m/s)	41.83	4.80	52.04	4:58.37	7693
2nd place, silver medalist(s)	Nadir El Fassi	France	11.00 (w: 1.8 m/s)	7.19	14.89	2.04	50.40	15.13 (w: -0.7 m/s)	38.22	4.40	49.99	4:28.19	7677
3rd place, bronze medalist(s)	Mikko Halvari	Finland	10.87 (w: 1.8 m/s)	6.59	14.35	1.92	50.27	16.09 (w: -0.9 m/s)	51.27	4.60	54.88	4:48.97	7587
4	Lassi Raunio	Finland	11.06 (w: 1.1 m/s)	6.86	11.28	1.95	50.35	14.58 (w: 0.3 m/s)	42.72	4.30	55.31	4:51.42	7349
5	Pavel Moskalenko	Russia	11.31 (w: 1.8 m/s)	6.77	13.22	2.01	52.41	15.80 (w: -0.9 m/s)	38.91	4.50	57.72	4:44.21	7269
6	Darius Draudvila	Lithuania	11.20 (w: 1.8 m/s)	6.82	14.16	1.92	50.62	14.92 (w: -0.7 m/s)	43.68	3.90	48.79	4:46.15	7245
7	Christopher Hallmann	Germany	10.75 (w: 1.8 m/s)	6.92	13.62	1.86	48.73	15.38 (w: -0.7 m/s)	33.79	3.80	50.13	4:26.51	7235
8	Uwe Büchele	Germany	11.36 (w: 1.1 m/s)	6.52	13.94	1.83	50.23	16.30 (w: -0.9 m/s)	42.22	4.40	53.40	4:29.16	7195
9	Mikk Pahapill	Estonia	11.54 (w: 1.8 m/s)	6.88	14.70	1.92	52.89	15.95 (w: 0.3 m/s)	43.33	4.20	53.98	4:47.66	7142
10	Tanel Türk	Estonia	11.35 (w: 1.1 m/s)	6.69	15.20	1.83	50.39	16.52 (w: -0.7 m/s)	43.46	3.90	48.62	4:39.46	7029
11	Akira Kano	Japan	10.99 (w: 1.8 m/s)	6.91	11.06	1.89	49.62	15.13 (w: -0.7 m/s)	36.61	3.80	46.36	4:33.41	6990
12	Donovan Kilmartin	United States	10.99 (w: 1.8 m/s)	7.27	13.59	2.04	50.82	15.06 (w: -0.9 m/s)	DNS	4.60	45.51	4:34.48	6930
13	Ángel Barreda	Spain	10.80 (w: 1.8 m/s)	7.14	11.64	1.80	49.65	15.13 (w: 0.3 m/s)	35.28	3.90	40.57	4:42.76	6902
14	Bjørn Sommerfeldt	Norway	11.43 (w: 1.8 m/s)	6.66	13.19	1.80	51.28	15.39 (w: -0.9 m/s)	39.32	3.90	51.59	4:43.92	6876
15	David Gervasi	Switzerland	11.49 (w: 1.1 m/s)	6.39	14.16	1.86	52.58	15.18 (w: 0.3 m/s)	33.83	4.40	48.62	4:50.32	6829
16	Rifat Artikov	Uzbekistan	11.37 (w: 1.8 m/s)	6.64	14.88	1.86	50.85	15.49 (w: -0.9 m/s)	43.25	DNS	52.39	4:59.24	6456
17	Mathias Cerlati	France	11.08 (w: 1.1 m/s)	6.96	14.01	1.86	52.32	15.69 (w: 0.3 m/s)	38.46	DNS	48.42	DNS	5732
	Ludo van der Plaat	Netherlands	11.22 (w: 1.8 m/s)	6.55	DNS	1.83	50.16	15.65 (w: -0.7 m/s)	32.78	DNS	DNS	DNS	DNF
	Nicordo Walters	Jamaica	11.80 (w: 1.1 m/s)	5.84	13.79	1.80	DNS	DNS	DNS	DNS	DNS	DNS	DNF
	Jiří Kliner	Czech Republic	11.21 (w: 1.1 m/s)	6.51	DNS	DNS	DNS	DNS	DNS	DNS	DNS	DNS	DNF

== Participation ==
According to an unofficial count, 20 athletes from 15 countries participated in the event.

- Czech Republic (1)
- Estonia (2)
- Finland (2)
- France (2)
- Germany (2)
- Jamaica (1)
- Japan (1)
- Lithuania (1)
- Netherlands (1)
- Norway (1)
- Russia (1)
- Spain (1)
- Switzerland (1)
- United States (1)
- Uzbekistan (2)
