= 2002 Hypo-Meeting =

The 28th edition of the annual Hypo-Meeting took place on June 1 and June 2, 2002 in Götzis, Austria. The track and field competition, featuring a decathlon (men) and a heptathlon (women) event, was part of the 2002 IAAF World Combined Events Challenge.

== Men's Decathlon ==
=== Schedule ===
June 1
1. 100 m
2. Long Jump
3. Shot Put
4. High Jump
5. 400 m

June 2
6. 110 m hurdles
7. Discus Throw
8. Pole Vault
9. Javelin Throw
10. 1,500 m

=== Records ===
World Record	Roman Šebrle (CZE)	9026	May 27, 2001	Götzis, Austria
Event Record	Roman Šebrle (CZE)	9026	May 27, 2001	Götzis, Austria

=== Results ===
Rank	Athlete	Decathlon										Points
Rank	Athlete	1	2	3	4	5	6	7	8	9	10	Points
1	Roman Šebrle (CZE)	10,95	7.79	15.50	2.12	48,35	13,89	48.02	5.00	68.97	4.38,16	8800
2	Tom Pappas (USA)	10,85	7.62	15.32	2.18	49,47	13,93	45.75	5.20	63.42	4.57,17	8583
3	Oleksandr Yurkov (UKR)	10,89	7.81	15.76	1.94	49,58	14,26	49.53	5.40	56.14	4.40,64	8509
4	Attila Zsivoczky (HUN)	11,20	7.05	15.36	2.12	50,17	14,96	45.01	4.70	64.60	4.29,01	8175
5	Jaakko Ojaniemi (FIN)	10,65	7.55	15.13	2.00	48,73	14,83	40.29	4.60	63.03	4.46,35	8117
6	Jón Arnar Magnússon (ISL)	10,99	7.51	16.27	1.97	49,57	14,51	45.30	4.60	61.75	4.55,15	8104
7	Stephen Moore (USA)	10,78	7.18	13.45	2.09	48,08	14,40	41.04	4.80	53.12	4.43,18	8008
8	William Frullani (ITA)	10,57	7.65	13.88	2.15	48,47	14,28	40.89	4.40	48.68	4.56,49	7984
9	Eugenio Balanqué (CUB)	10,83	6.90	15.11	1.94	49,44	14,42	42.32	4.70	61.12	4.47,63	7915
10	Rolf Schläfli (SUI)	11,28	7.21	14.80	1.94	49,56	14,87	43.79	4.80	58.41	4.36,73	7895
11	Lars Albert (GER)	11,13	7.44	14.32	1.91	50,64	14,93	41.95	4.80	60.11	4.38,87	7845
12	Klaus Ambrosch (AUT)	11,16	6.94	14.06	1.88	49,37	14,43	40.78	4.50	65.57	4.28,61	7832
13	Dmitri Ivanov (RUS)	11,16	7.34	14.12	1.88	48,60	14,64	41.43	4.90	55.31	4.47,70	7802
14	Thomas Walser (AUT)	10,89	6.95	15.50	1.91	49,97	14,94	43.64	4.20	60.42	4.32,94	7784
15	Roland Schwarzl (AUT)	11,19	7.49	14.59	1.85	50,52	14,91	41.12	5.00	52.61	4.35,96	7767
16	Michael Nolan (CAN)	11,23	7.43	15.05	1.88	52,03	15,40	48.64	4.60	55.98	4.46,33	7693
17	Jörg Goedicke (GER)	11,11	7.01	14.19	1.94	50,56	14,54	40.71	4.90	55.42	4.54,89	7654
—	Chiel Warners (NED)	10,91	7.42	13.69	1.94	48.63	14,54	39.80	4.60	51.91	—	DNF
—	Dennis Leyckes (GER)	11,01	7.13	—	—	—	—	—	—	—	—	DNF
—	Zsolt Kürtösi (HUN)	11,29	—	—	—	—	—	—	—	—	—	DNF

== Women's Heptathlon ==
=== Schedule ===
June 1
1. 100 m hurdles
2. High Jump
3. Shot Put
4. 200 m

June 2
5. Long Jump
6. Javelin Throw
7. 800 m

=== Records ===
World Record	Jackie Joyner-Kersee (USA)	7291	September 24, 1988	Seoul, South Korea
Event Record	Sabine Braun (GER)	6985	May 31, 1992	Götzis, Austria

=== Results ===
Rank	Athlete	Heptathlon							Points
Rank	Athlete	1	2	3	4	5	6	7	Points
1	Shelia Burrell (USA)	13.19	1.67	13.72	23.50	6.41	46.38	2:16.10	6363
2	Sabine Braun (GER)	13.49	1.76	14.18	24.63	6.19	48.18	2:17.41	6299
3	Kathleen Gutjahr (GER)	13.33	1.76	12.79	24.99	6.22	44.51	2:11.29	6222
4	Sonja Kesselschläger (GER)	13.48	1.79	13.43	24.57	6.31	40.19	2:16.73	6187
5	Julie Hollman (GBR)	14.02	1.85	12.09	24.36	6.42	36.65	2:13.00	6135
6	Yelena Chernyavskaya (RUS)	13.89	1.73	13.03	24.83	6.16	39.91	2:11.64	6022
7	Tatyana Gordeyeva (RUS)	14.34	1.82	13.92	25.83	6.14	40.13	2:13.14	6017
8	Gertrud Bacher (ITA)	14.05	1.73	12.97	24.73	5.96	41.20	2:11.94	5962
9	Katja Keller (GER)	13.78	1.67	12.42	24.39	6.10	40.46	2:13.90	5925
10	Simone Oberer (SUI)	14.03	1.76	12.26	25.41	6.07	38.39	2:17.40	5796
11	Natalya Roshchupkina (RUS)	14.16	1.76	14.82	24.69	5.64	40.79	—	5071

== See also ==
- 2002 Decathlon Year Ranking
- 2002 European Athletics Championships – Men's Decathlon
- 2002 European Athletics Championships – Women's heptathlon
