= Athletics at the 2003 Pan American Games – Men's decathlon =

Men's decathlon at the Pan American Games

The men's decathlon event of the 2003 Pan American Games took place on Tuesday 5 August and Wednesday 6 August 2003.

== Medalists ==
Gold	Stephen Moore; United States
Silver	Luiggy Llanos; Puerto Rico
Bronze	Yonelvis Águila; Cuba

== Records ==
World record	Roman Šebrle (CZE)	9026	27 May 2001	Götzis, Austria
Pan Am record	Chris Huffins (USA)	8170	25 July 1999	Winnipeg, Canada

== Results ==
Rank	Athlete	Decathlon										Points
Rank	Athlete	1	2	3	4	5	6	7	8	9	10	Points
1	Stephen Moore (USA)	10.75	7.30	11.83	2.10	48.16	14.79	42.44	4.50	50.35	4:41.71	7809
2	Luiggy Llanos (PUR)	11.02	7.47	14.62	1.86	50.27	14.29	43.93	4.50	59.78	5:11.24	7704
3	Yonelvis Águila (CUB)	11.16	7.06	13.77	2.01	50.24	14.89	47.04	3.70	63.01	4:49.93	7593
4	Santiago Lorenzo (ARG)	11.31	6.89	13.57	1.83	49.94	15.18	40.98	4.70	58.68	4:42.37	7467
5	Enrique Aguirre (ARG)	11.06	7.00	13.51	1.98	50.20	15.17	39.93	4.20	52.12	4:49.47	7356
—	Octavius Gillespie (GUA)	11.48	5.58	12.35	1.98	—	—	—	—	—	—	DNF
—	Kip Janvrin (USA)	11.28	6.75	14.07	—	—	—	—	—	—	—	DNF

== See also ==
- 2003 Decathlon Year Ranking
- 2003 Hypo-Meeting
- 2003 World Championships in Athletics – Men's decathlon
- Athletics at the 2003 Summer Universiade – Men's decathlon
- Athletics at the 2004 Summer Olympics – Men's decathlon
