= William Frullani =

Italian decathlete

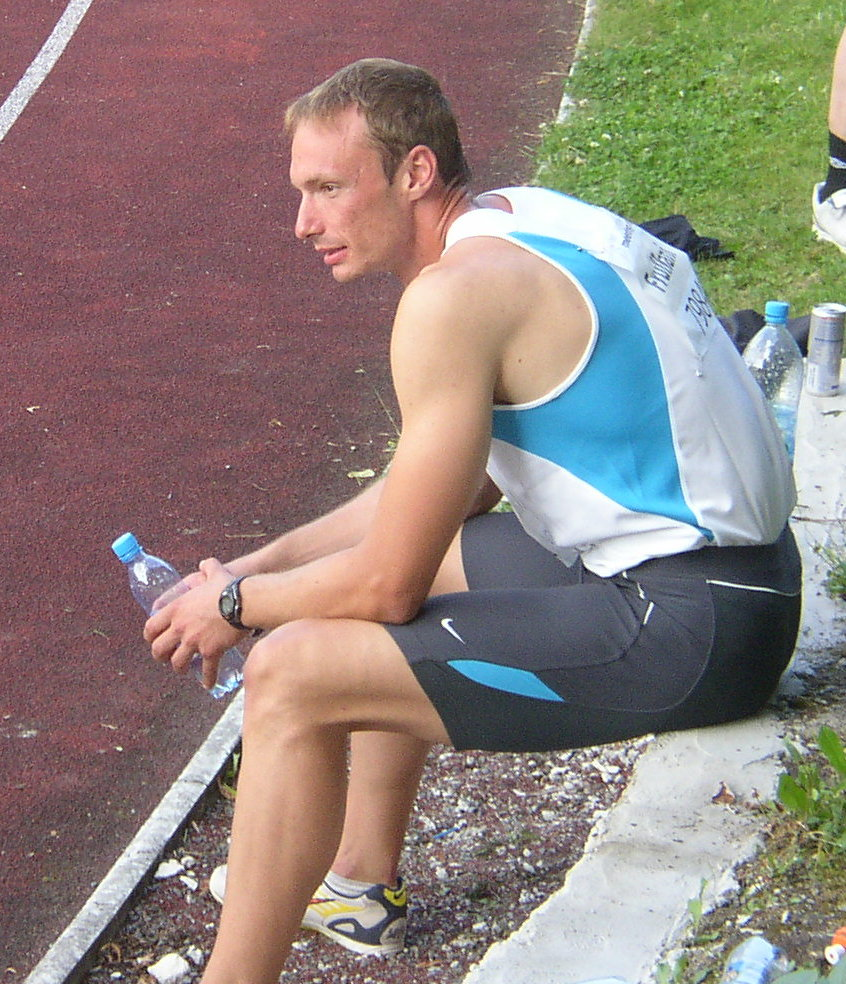
- William Frullani at the 2008 TNT - Fortuna Meeting in Kladno

Personal information
- Nationality: Italian
- Born: 21 September 1979 (age 46) Prato, Italy
- Height: 1.91 m (6 ft 3 in)
- Weight: 93 kg (205 lb)

Sport
- Country: Italy
- Sport: Athletics
- Event: Combined events
- Club: C.S. Carabinieri

Achievements and titles
- Personal bests: Decathlon: 7984 (2002); Heptathlon indoor: 5972 (2009)
Medal record
Event	1st	2nd	3rd
European Cup Combined Events	1	0	0
European U23 Championships	0	0	1

William Frullani (born 21 September 1979 in Prato) is a decathlete and bobsleigh competitor from Italy.

== Biography ==
Frullani won two medals, one of these at senior level, at the International athletics competitions. He set his personal best score (7984 points) in the men's decathlon at the 2002 Hypo-Meeting in Götzis. In 2009 he finished 6th at the European Indoor Championships in Turin in the heptathlon with a national record of 5972 points.

He was married to his combined events fellow, the Ukrainian heptathlete Hanna Melnychenko.

== Achievements ==
Year	Competition	Venue	Position	Event	Notes
2001	European U23 Championships	Amsterdam, Netherlands	3rd	Decathlon	7871 pts
2001	World Student Games	Beijing, China	—	Decathlon	DNF
2002	Hypo-Meeting	Götzis, Austria	8th	Decathlon	7984 pts
2002	European Championships	Munich, Germany	9th	Decathlon	7863 pts
2004	Hypo-Meeting	Götzis, Austria	16th	Decathlon	7843 pts
2005	Hypo-Meeting	Götzis, Austria	17th	Decathlon	7547 pts
2006	European Championships	Gothenburg, Sweden	—	Decathlon	DNF
2009	European Indoor Championships	Turin, Italy	6th	Heptathlon	5972 pts
2009	Hypo-Meeting	Götzis, Austria	—	Decathlon	DNF

== National titles ==
He has won 5 times the individual national championship.

- 4 wins in the decathlon (2001, 2006, 2010, 2012)
- 1 win in the heptathlon indoor (2009)

== Bobsleigh ==
Frullani switched to bobsleigh in 2012. He tested positive for methylhexanamine at the 2014 Winter Olympics and was excluded from the Italian team. He was replaced by Samuele Romanini.

== See also ==
- Italian all-time top lists - Decathlon
