= Yonelvis Águila =

Cuban decathlete (born 1975)

Personal information
- Born: August 1, 1975 (age 50)

Sport
- Sport: Track and field
Medal record
Athletics
Representing Cuba
Pan American Games
Bronze medal – third place	2003 Santo Domingo	Decathlon
CAC Junior Championships (U20)
Gold medal – first place	1994 Port of Spain	Decathlon

Yonelvis Águila (born August 1, 1975) is a male decathlete from Cuba.

== Career ==
He set his personal best (7705 points) on February 23, 2002, in Havana.

== Achievements ==
Year	Competition	Venue	Position	Event	Notes
Representing Cuba
1994	Central American and Caribbean Junior Championships (U-20)	Port of Spain, Trinidad and Tobago	1st	Decathlon	7046 pts
1995	Central American and Caribbean Championships	Guatemala City, Guatemala	2nd	Decathlon	7563 pts A
1996	Ibero-American Championships	Medellín, Colombia	1st	Decathlon	7705 pts
2001	Central American and Caribbean Championships	Guatemala City, Guatemala	3rd	Decathlon	7196 pts A
2003	Central American and Caribbean Championships	St. George's, Grenada	1st	Decathlon	7337 pts
2003	Pan American Games	Santo Domingo, Dominican Republic	3rd	Decathlon	7593 pts
