= 1994 Central American and Caribbean Junior Championships in Athletics =

XI Central American and Caribbean Junior Championships
- Dates: 8–10 July
- Host city: Port of Spain, Trinidad and Tobago
- Level: Junior and Youth
- Events: 79 (41 junior, 38 youth)
- Participation: about 377 (203 junior, 174 youth) athletes from 22 nations

The 11th Central American and Caribbean Junior Championships was held in Port of Spain, Trinidad and Tobago, between 8–10 July 1994.

== Medal summary ==
Medal winners are published by category: Junior A, Male, Junior A, Female, and Junior B. Complete results can be found on the World Junior Athletics History website.

=== Male Junior A (under 20) ===
Event	Gold		Silver		Bronze	
100 metres (-0.3 m/s)	Obadele Thompson (BAR)	10.0	Yosbel Crespo (CUB)	10.2	Judson Jervis (BAH)	10.3
200 metres (-0.2 m/s)	Obadele Thompson (BAR)	21.1	Brian Babbs (BAH)	21.7	César Jongitud (MEX)	21.8
400 metres	Michael McDonald (JAM)	46.3	Rohan McDonald (JAM)	47.1	Peter Frederick (TRI)	48.0
800 metres	Preston Campbell (JAM)	1:53.1	Ivor Hamilton (TRI)	1:53.2	Marvin Watts (JAM)	1:53.6
1500 metres	Pablo Olmedo (MEX)	3:50.2	Ismael Iglesias (CUB)	3:50.7	Emigadio Delgado (VEN)	3:51.4
5000 metres	Pablo Olmedo (MEX)	14:24.4	Juan Perea (MEX)	14:27.7	Emigadio Delgado (VEN)	15:10.9
10,000 metres	Juan Perea (MEX)	30:42.7	Juan Delgado (MEX)	31:44.5		
Half Marathon	Isidoro Martínez (MEX)	1:09:28	Javier Patlán (MEX)	1:16:19	Odinga Bascombe (GUY)	1:25:36
3000 metres steeplechase	Ismael Iglesias (CUB)	9:07.6	Emigadio Delgado (VEN)	9:22.0	Alex Greaux (PUR)	9:27.8
110 metres hurdles (0.7 m/s)	Gabriel Burnett (BAR)	14.3	William Lugo (CUB)	14.6	José Carmona (PUR)	14.6
400 metres hurdles	Edward Clarke (JAM)	51.1	Kevin James (JAM)	51.1	Juan Mago (VEN)	53.1
High jump	Stephen Woodley (BER)	2.14	Enrico Gordan (JAM)	2.11	Rohan Simons (BER)	2.08
Pole vault	Jorge Tienda (MEX)	4.55	Ricardo Díez (VEN)	4.45	Alexander Díaz (CUB)	4.45
Long jump	Pedro Pavel García (CUB)	7.63	Elston Cawley (JAM)	7.47	Luis Soto (PUR)	7.30
Triple jump	Allen Mortimer (BAH)	16.10	Rene Hernandez (CUB)	15.65	Vance Clarke (SKN)	15.07
Shot put	Christopher Merced (PUR)	14.52	Alexei Silva (CUB)	13.78	O'Neil Smythe (JAM)	13.40
Discus throw	Guillermo Heredia (MEX)	48.04	Christopher Merced (PUR)	47.16	Bernardo Lazo (MEX)	41.58
Hammer throw	Aldo Bello (VEN)	54.68	Javier Cárdenas (CUB)	51.22	Ramón Arce (MEX)	44.34
Javelin throw	Leonid Sánchez (CUB)	62.92	Selwyn Smith (GRN)	59.88	Ricardo Montes (MEX)	54.78
Decathlon	Yonelvis Águila (CUB)	7046	Jorge Avena (MEX)	6228	Francisco Herrera (MEX)	5948
10,000 metres track walk	Alejandro López (MEX)	41:52.0	Francisco Pantoja (MEX)	43:27.1	Erick Cordero (CUB)	44:46.5
4 × 100 metres relay	Jamaica	41.1	Trinidad and Tobago	41.8	Venezuela	41.9
4 × 400 metres relay	Jamaica	3:05.9	Trinidad and Tobago	3:10.9	Venezuela	3:18.5

=== Female Junior A (under 20) ===
Event	Gold		Silver		Bronze	
100 metres (-1.8 m/s)	Debbie Ferguson (BAH)	11.1	Beverley Langley (JAM)	11.2	Kerry-Ann Richards (JAM)	11.2
200 metres (-1.8 m/s)	Astia Walker (JAM)	23.5	Debbie Ferguson (BAH)	23.8	Tracey Barnes (JAM)	24.0
400 metres	Claudine Williams (JAM)	52.8	Tracey Barnes (JAM)	53.2	Militza Castro (PUR)	54.0
800 metres	Michelle Ballentine (JAM)	2:08.5	Charmaine Howell (JAM)	2:09.1	Jeanette Castro (MEX)	2:09.4
1500 metres	Laura Flores (MEX)	4:34.3	Evette Turner (JAM)	4:44.1	Aydollie Miller (JAM)	4:46.5
3000 metres	Karla Betancourt (MEX)	9:53.3	Evette Turner (JAM)	10:21.8	Rosemary Brown (VIN)	10:45.8
100 metres hurdles (-1.0 m/s)	Astia Walker (JAM)	13.5	Delloreen Ennis (JAM)	14.0	Glenis Fabars (CUB)	14.1
400 metres hurdles	Tanya Jarrett (JAM)	59.5	Greter Lorenzo (CUB)	60.0	Andrea Blackett (BAR)	62.1
High jump	Natalie Richardson (JAM)	1.79	Paulette Reid (BAR)	1.79	Tanya Wildgoose (BAH)	1.75
Long jump	Trecia Smith (JAM)	6.40	Suzette Lee (JAM)	5.88	Elizabeth Moré (CUB)	5.63
Triple jump	Suzette Lee (JAM)	13.26	Sandra Friedrich (MEX)	12.31	Aneandin Godines (CUB)	12.27
Shot put	Nora Bicet (CUB)	12.50	Datza Varcarcel (PUR)	12.33	Fanny García (VEN)	12.08
Discus throw	Fanny García (VEN)	42.60	Gretel Miller (JAM)	39.88	Flor Acosta (MEX)	38.78
Javelin throw	Nora Bicet (CUB)	50.50	Yanuris La Montaña (CUB)	50.30	Patricia Alonso (VEN)	49.30
Heptathlon	Yaqueline Martínez (CUB)	4944	Trecia Smith (JAM)	4899	Sheila Acosta (PUR)	4644
5000 metres track walk	Maribel Rebollo (MEX)	22:11.6	Misleidys Vargas (CUB)	24:15.3	Caroline Aguilar (MEX)	24:29.2
4 × 100 metres relay	Jamaica	44.6	Puerto Rico	47.3	Barbados	47.3
4 × 400 metres relay	Jamaica	3:34.0	Bahamas	3:42.5	Barbados	3:45.6

=== Male Junior B (under 17) ===
Event	Gold		Silver		Bronze	
100 metres (-1.3 m/s)	Jason Gerald (TRI)	10.5	Christopher Rose (JAM)	10.5	Shane Brown (JAM)	10.5
200 metres (-2.5 m/s)	Rohan Goldyn (JAM)	22.4	Latonel Williams (JAM)	22.5	Misael Ortíz (CUB)	22.8
400 metres	Latonel Williams (JAM)	48.9	Marlon de Leon (TRI)	49.2	Luiggy Llanos (PUR)	49.5
800 metres	Oscar Encarnación (DOM)	1:53.7	Adith Figueroa (PUR)	1:54.5	Didris Contreras (DOM)	1:57.6
1500 metres	Luis Medina (MEX)	3:56.9	Oscar Encarnación (DOM)	3:57.8	Gonzalo Gutiérrez (MEX)	3:58.4
3000 metres	Luis Medina (MEX)	8:42.7	Gonzalo Gutiérrez (MEX)	8:43.5	Narvin Beharry (TRI)	9:10.0
2000 metres steeplechase	Luis Medina (MEX)	5:58.7	Jaime Siqueiros (MEX)	6:02.5	Johnny Peña (DOM)	6:27.0
100 metres hurdles (-1.5 m/s)	Robert Parnell (JAM)	13.5	Chris McFarlane (JAM)	13.7	Ramón Soto (PUR)	13.9
400 metres hurdles	Kurt Duncan (JAM)	55.3	Pedro Rivas (PUR)	55.6	Edwin Esparra (PUR)	57.0
High jump	Ryan Chambers (JAM)	2.09	Kerry Edwards (TRI)	2.06	Yohance Young (BAR)	1.93
Pole vault	Makirk Ramos (PUR)	3.65	Gudardo Zamido (MEX)	3.05	Dion Kong (TRI)	3.05
Long jump	Juan Mota (DOM)	7.01	Oral Telphia (JAM)	6.69	Michael Deveaux (BAH)	6.69
Triple jump	Pablo Pérez (PUR)	14.02	Ramón Soto (PUR)	13.72	Dominic Demeritte (BAH)	13.70
Shot put	Dave Stoute (TRI)	14.69	Jesús Martínez (MEX)	14.06	Rory Marsh (JAM)	13.56
Discus throw	Rory Marsh (JAM)	45.00	Denzil Rolle (BAH)	43.86	Dave Stoute (TRI)	43.74
Hammer throw	Eric Román (PUR)	46.40	Carlos Hernández (PUR)	45.68	Ricardo Sierra (MEX)	44.18
Javelin throw	Kerry Edwards (TRI)	55.80	Samuel Ortiz (PUR)	54.08	Adolfo Martínez (MEX)	50.32
Heptathlon	Rolando Ubarri (PUR)	4696	Alejandro Escalona (MEX)	3924	Andrew Swanston (TRI)	3821
5000 metres track walk	Saúl Méndez (MEX)	23:33.0	Gildardo Pérez (MEX)	24:24.2	Gabriel Alvarado (PUR)	26:54.1
4 × 100 metres relay	Jamaica	42.2	Puerto Rico	42.9	Trinidad and Tobago	43.4
4 × 400 metres relay	Jamaica	3:20.6	Puerto Rico	3:23.2	Mexico	3:28.2

=== Female Junior B (under 17) ===
Event	Gold		Silver		Bronze	
100 metres (-0.4 m/s)	Tulia Robinson (JAM)	11.0	Ayanna Hutchinson (TRI)	11.4	Saran Patterson (JAM)	11.5
200 metres (-2.3 m/s)	Tulia Robinson (JAM)	24.3	Cydonie Mothersill (CAY)	24.8	Onica Fraser (GUY)	24.9
400 metres	Onica Fraser (GUY)	54.5	Cindy John (TRI)	54.5	Ingrid Sears (BAH)	55.5
800 metres	Vernae Ingram (BER)	2:14.2	Yasmin Rodríguez (DOM)	2:15.0	Erica Lugo (MEX)	2:15.8
1200 metres	Janelle Inniss (BAR)	3:38.9	Yasmin Rodríguez (DOM)	3:39.3	Keisha Gray (TRI)	3:39.7
100 metres hurdles (-1.3 m/s)	Ángeles Pantoja (MEX)	14.4	Niurka Lussón (CUB)	14.8	Ayanna Buchannon (JAM)	14.9
300 metres hurdles	Yasnay Lescay (CUB)	42.8	Ángeles Pantoja (MEX)	43.6	Gabriella Edwards (TRI)	45.0
High jump	Niurka Lussón (CUB)	1.80	Keisha Spencer (JAM)	1.65	Ayesha Maycock (BAR)	1.65
Long jump	Anna Winter (CUB)	6.12	Dolette Blake (JAM)	5.99	Niurka Barthelemy (CUB)	5.62
Triple jump	Niurka Barthelemy (CUB)	11.65	Christine Brown (JAM)	11.59	Andrea Bradshaw (BAR)	11.52
Shot put	Antuanett Depestre (CUB)	14.76	Yuneidis Bonne (CUB)	13.62	Karelis Parker (PUR)	13.57
Discus throw	Yuneidis Bonne (CUB)	43.30	Karla Soto (MEX)	35.80	Doris Thompson (BAH)	34.52
Javelin throw	Osleidys Menéndez (CUB)	47.32	Michelle Sánchez (PUR)	39.54	Anna-Lee Walcott (TRI)	36.66
Pentathlon	Damaris Diana (PUR)	3243	Pamela Cappas (PUR)	3220	Anna-Lee Walcott (TRI)	3105
4000 metres track walk	Yéssica Tapía (MEX)	20:49.2	Juana Hernández (MEX)	20:56.0	Glenis Castillo (DOM)	24:39.5
4 × 100 metres relay	Jamaica	46.1	Trinidad and Tobago	47.2	Bahamas	47.3
4 × 400 metres relay	Trinidad and Tobago	3:45.0	Jamaica	3:50.0	Dominican Republic	3:51.3

== Medal table (unofficial) ==
* Host nation (Trinidad and Tobago)

Rank	Nation	Gold	Silver	Bronze	Total
1	Jamaica (JAM)	26	21	9	56
2	Mexico (MEX)	16	15	13	44
3	Cuba (CUB)	15	10	7	32
4	Puerto Rico (PUR)	6	12	10	28
5	Trinidad and Tobago (TTO)*	4	8	10	22
6	Barbados (BAR)	4	1	6	11
7	Dominican Republic (DOM)	2	3	4	9
8	Venezuela (VEN)	2	2	7	11
9	Bermuda (BER)	2	0	1	3
10	Bahamas (BAH)	1	5	7	13
11	Guyana (GUY)	1	0	2	3
12	Cayman Islands (CAY)	0	1	0	1
12	Grenada (GRN)	0	1	0	1
14	Saint Kitts and Nevis (SKN)	0	0	1	1
14	Saint Vincent and the Grenadines (VIN)	0	0	1	1
Totals (15 entries)		79	79	78	236

== Participation (unofficial) ==
Saint Lucia competed for the first time at the championships. Detailed result lists can be found on the "World Junior Athletics History" website. An unofficial count yields a number of about 377 athletes (203 junior (under-20) and 174 youth (under-17)) from about 22 countries, a new record number of participating nations:

- Antigua and Barbuda (4)
- Bahamas (37)
- Barbados (18)
- Bermuda (7)
- British Virgin Islands (3)
- Cayman Islands (1)
- Cuba (35)
- Dominican Republic (21)
- El Salvador (2)
- Grenada (4)
- Guatemala (5)
- Guyana (2)
- Jamaica (58)
- (Mexico) México (76)
- Netherlands Antilles (2)
- Puerto Rico (41)
- Saint Kitts and Nevis (2)
- Saint Lucia (3)
- Saint Vincent and the Grenadines (2)
- Trinidad and Tobago (36)
- U.S. Virgin Islands (1)
- Venezuela (17)
