= Décastar =

Athletics competition in France

- Sport: Athletics
- Founded: 1976
- Website: Official website

Décastar (stylised DECASTAR) is an annual athletics competition that takes place in Talence, in the department of the Gironde in France. Organised by ADEM L'ADEM, it is one of the athletics meetings that make up the World Athletics Challenge – Combined Events. Male and female athletes compete in the decathlon or heptathlon, respectively, and points scored at the Décastar count towards a yearly total for the parent competition.

== History ==
The Décastar competition was first established in 1976 and, after further editions in 1977, 1978, 1980 and 1984, it was held annually from 1986 onwards. During the first four editions the women competed in the pentathlon. Since its inception it has become one the premier combined event meetings: the 1996 Olympic champion Dan O'Brien set a world record in the decathlon at the 1992 edition, a mark which went unbeaten for nearly seven years. At the 2004 edition, the organisers included the rarely competed women's decathlon and Marie Collonvillé set the world record with 8150 points. The 2020 edition was cancelled due to the COVID-19 pandemic and the 2021 edition due to the pandemic and renovation of the Talence stadium.

== Competition format ==
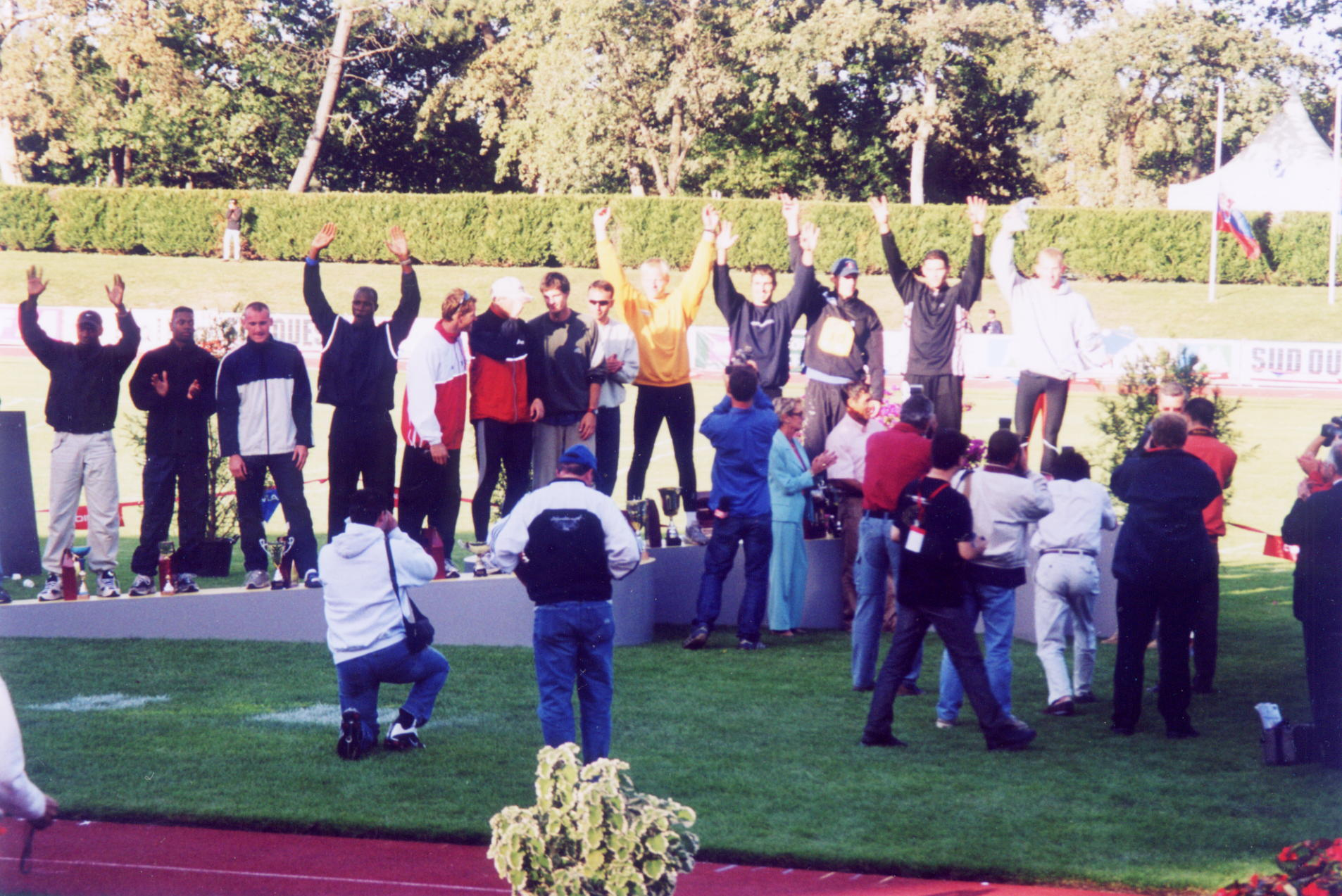
Athletes celebrating at the podium at the end of the 2001 edition

As with most international combined events competitions, the programme is spread over two days.

Decathlon		Heptathlon	
Day one	Day two	Day one	Day two
100 metres	110 metres hurdles	100 metres hurdles	Long jump
Long jump	Discus throw	High jump	Javelin throw
Shot put	Pole vault	Shot put	800 metres
High jump	Javelin	200 metres	—
400 metres	1500 metres	—	—

== Records ==
=== Men's ===
Men's meeting records of the Décastar
Event	Record	Athlete	Nation	Date	Meet	Ref.
100 m	10.29 (+1.4 m/s)	Chris Huffins	United States	13 September 1997	1997	
400 m	46.43	Ayden Owens-Delerme	Puerto Rico	5 July 2025	2025	
1500 m	4:10.57	Gaël Querin	France	20 September 2009	2009	
110 m hurdles	13.68 (−0.8 m/s)	Finley Gaio	Switzerland	18 September 2022	2022	
High jump	2.22 m	Christian Schenk	East Germany	16 September 1988	1988	
Pole vault	5.75 m	Jean Galfione	France	15 September 1996	1996	
Long jump	8.08 (+1.8 m/s)	Dan O'Brien	United States	4 September 1992	1992	
Shot put	16.72 m	Maurice Smith	Jamaica	23 September 2007	2007	
Discus throw	53.84 m	Brian Brophy	United States	5 September 1992	1992	
Javelin throw	72.22 m	Sébastien Levicq	France	11 September 1994	1994	
Decathlon	9126 pts	Kevin Mayer	France	16 September 2018	2018	
Decathlon	100m (wind) / Long jump (wind) / Shot put / High jump / 400m / 110m H (wind) / Discus / Pole vault / Javelin / 1500m; 10.55 (+0.3 m/s) / 7.80 m (+1.2 m/s) / 16.00 m / 2.05 m / 48.42 / 13.75 m (−1.1 m/s) / 50.54 m / 5.45 m / 71.90 m / 4:46.11					

=== Women's ===
Women's meeting records of the Décastar
Event	Record	Athlete	Nation	Date	Meet	Ref.
200 m	22.84 (−1.1 m/s)	Heike Drechsler	Germany	10 September 1994	1994	
800 m	2:01.84 WHB	Nadine Debois	France	27 September 1987	1987	
100 m hurdles	12.88 (+0.6 m/s)	Nadine Visser	Netherlands	19 September 2015	2015	
100 m hurdles	12.88 (+0.8 m/s)	Michelle Atherley	United States	5 July 2025	2025	
High jump	2.02 m WHB	Nafissatou Thiam	Belgium	22 June 2019	2019	
Long jump	6.95 m (+1.0 m/s)	Heike Drechsler	Germany	11 September 1994	1994	
Shot put	16.48 m	Nataliya Dobrynska	Ukraine	19 September 2009	2009	
Javelin throw	60.90 m	Barbora Spotakova	Czech Republic	16 September 2012	2012	
Heptathlon	6831 pts	Denise Lewis	Great Britain	30 July 2000	2000	
Heptathlon	100m H (wind) / High jump / Shot put / 200m (wind) / Long jump (wind) / Javelin / 800m; 13.13 (+1.0 m/s) / 1.84 m / 15.07 m / 24.01 (+3.6 m/s) / 6.69 m (−0.4 m/s) / 49.42 m / 2:12.20					
Decathlon	8150 pts	Marie Collonvillé	France	26 September 2004	2004	

== Winners ==
Key: Meet record

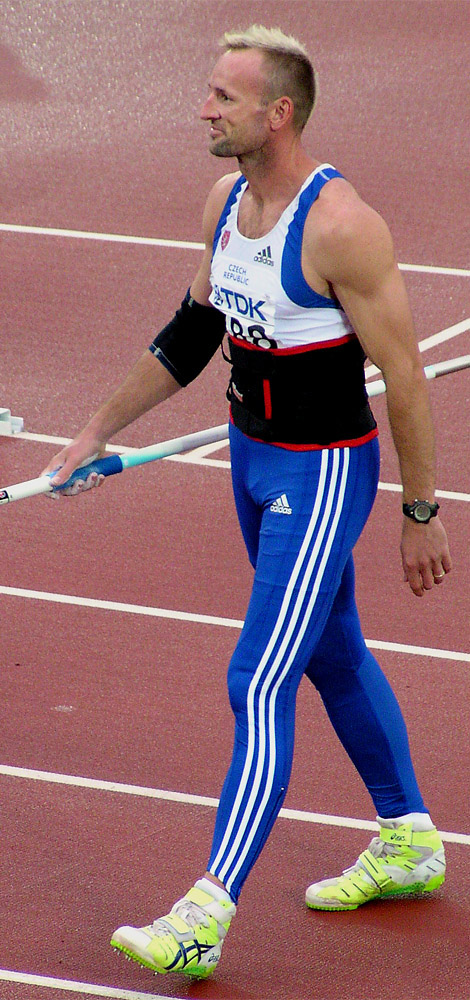
Three-time World Champion Tomáš Dvořák had back-to-back decathlon wins in 1999 to 2000.

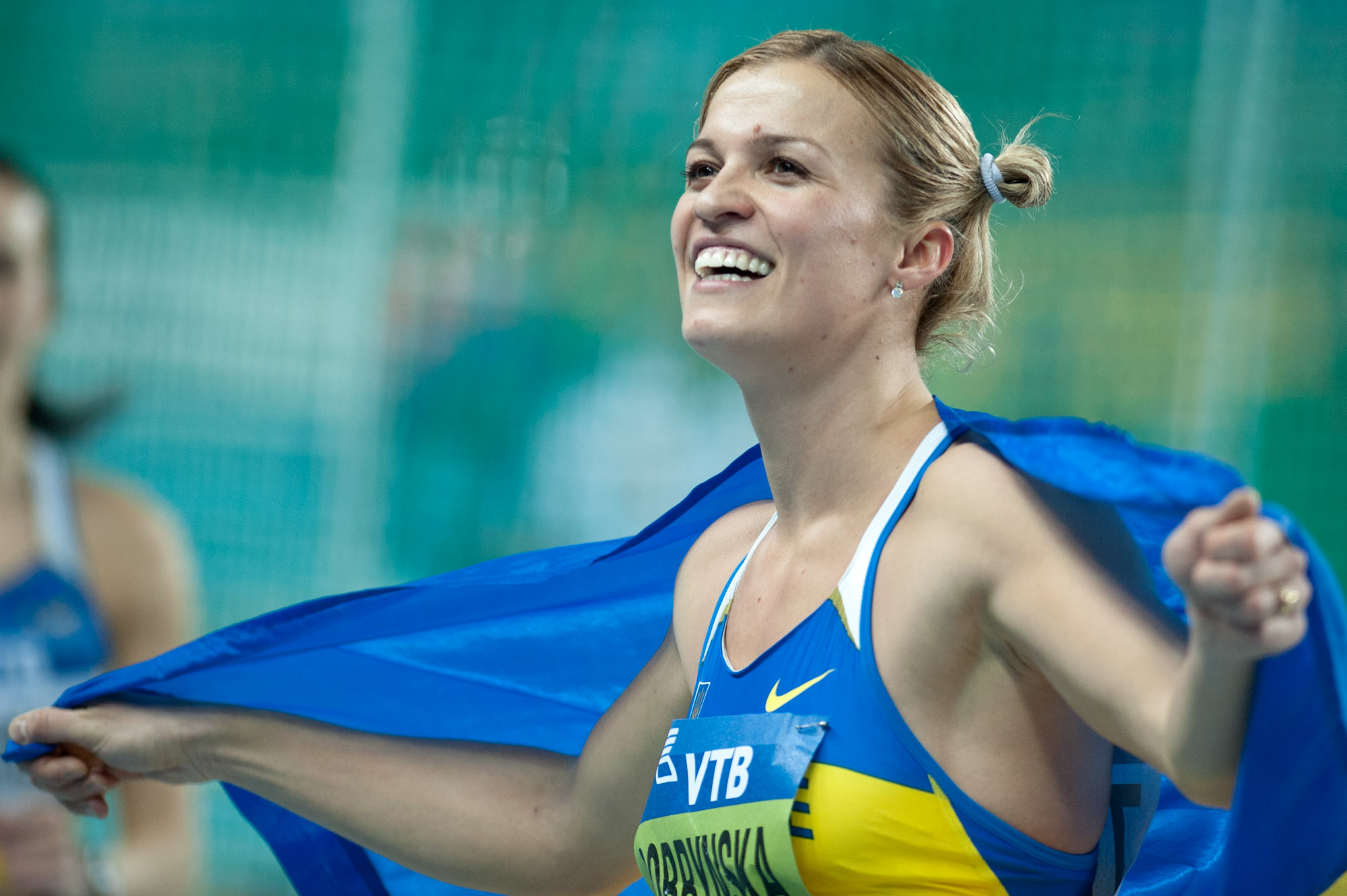
The 2008 Olympic champion Nataliya Dobrynska is a two-time winner of the Decastar heptathlon

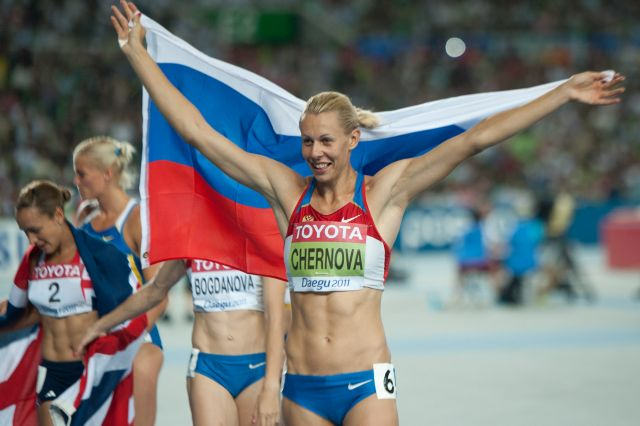
Tatyana Chernova's heptathlon win in 2011 followed her gold medal at the 2011 World Championships in Athletics.

Edition	Men's decathlon		Women's heptathlon	
Edition	Decathlon winner	Points	Heptathlon winner	Points
1976	Aleksandr Grebenyuk (URS)	8468	Sue Longden (GBR)	4357 (Note: Women competed in the pentathlon.)
1977	Yves Le Roy (FRA)	8058	Marie-Christine Debourse (FRA)	4188
1978	Valeriy Kachanov (URS)	7930	Ekaterina Smirnova (URS)	4596
1980	Georg Werthner (AUT)	7937	Florence Picaut (FRA)	4463
1984	Torsten Voss (GDR)	8428	Jane Frederick (USA)	6714
1986	Christian Plaziat (FRA)	7944	Małgorzata Nowak (POL)	6258
1987	Pavel Tarnavetskiy (URS)	8220	Jane Frederick (USA)	6533
1988	Christian Plaziat (FRA)	8512	Anke Behmer (GDR)	6733
1989	Christian Plaziat (FRA)	8512	Larisa Nikitina (URS)	6599
1990	Christian Plaziat (FRA)	8525	Peggy Beer (GDR)	6321
1991	Christian Plaziat (FRA)	8456	Urszula Włodarczyk (POL)	6425
1992	Dan O'Brien (USA)	8891	Irina Belova (RUS)	6673
1993	Steve Fritz (USA)	8317	Tatyana Blokhina (RUS)	6703
1994	Dan O'Brien (USA)	8710	Heike Drechsler (GER)	6441
1995	Eduard Hämäläinen (BLR)	8430	Tatyana Blokhina (RUS)	6478
1996	Eduard Hämäläinen (BLR)	8478	Remigija Nazarovienė (LTU)	6451
1997	Chris Huffins (USA)	8425	Remigija Nazarovienė (LTU)	6536
1998	Jón Arnar Magnússon (ISL)	8410	Urszula Włodarczyk (POL)	6352
1999	Tomáš Dvořák (CZE)	8690	Eunice Barber (FRA)	6515
2000	Tomáš Dvořák (CZE)	8733	Denise Lewis (GBR)	6831
2001	Oleksandr Yurkov (UKR)	8324	Shelia Burrell (USA)	6454
2002	Tom Pappas (USA)	8525	Larisa Netšeporuk (EST)	6151
2003	Laurent Hernu (FRA)	8219	Yelena Prokhorova (RUS)	6254
2004	Roman Šebrle (CZE)	8217	Kelly Sotherton (GBR)	6242
2005	Roman Šebrle (CZE)	8326	Eunice Barber (FRA)	6675
2006	Dmitriy Karpov (KAZ)	8438	Nataliya Dobrynska (UKR)	6256
2007	Andrei Krauchanka (BLR)	8553	Lyudmyla Blonska (UKR)	6437
2008	Andrei Krauchanka (BLR)	8312	Hyleas Fountain (USA)	6473
2009	Oleksiy Kasyanov (UKR)	8291	Nataliya Dobrynska (UKR)	6485
2010	Leonel Suárez (CUB)	8328	Tatyana Chernova (RUS)	6453
2011	Hans Van Alphen (BEL)	8200	Tatyana Chernova (RUS)	6679
2012	Hans Van Alphen (BEL)	8293	Antoinette Nana Djimou (FRA)	6390
2013	Damian Warner (CAN)	8161	Hanna Melnychenko (UKR)	6308
2014	Mikk Pahapill (EST)	8077	Carolin Schäfer (GER)	6383
2015	Willem Coertzen (RSA)	8187	Györgyi Zsivoczky-Farkas (HUN)	6306
2016	Oleksiy Kasyanov (UKR)	8077	Nadine Broersen (NED)	6377
2017	Damian Warner (CAN)	8252	Anouk Vetter (NED)	6363
2018	Kevin Mayer (FRA)	9126	Carolin Schäfer (GER)	6457
2019	Pierce LePage (CAN)	8453	Nafissatou Thiam (BEL)	6819
2022	Lindon Victor (GRN)	8550	Ivona Dadic (AUT)	6233
2022	Lindon Victor (GRN)	8550	Emma Oosterwegel (NED)	6233
2023	Makenson Gletty (FRA)	8443	Emma Oosterwegel (NED)	6495
2024	Johannes Erm (EST)	8589	Martha Araújo (COL)	6429 AR
2025	Ayden Owens-Delerme (PUR)	8478	Martha Araújo (COL)	6451
