= Mário Aníbal =

Portuguese decathlete

Mário Aníbal Dias Sampaio Ramos (born 25 March 1972 in Nova Sintra, Angola) is a former Portuguese decathlete.

== Achievements ==
| Year | Competition | Venue | Position | Event | Notes |
Representing Portugal
| 1994 | Ibero-American Championships | Mar del Plata, Argentina | 1st | Decathlon | 7.431 pts W |
| 1997 | World Championships | Athens, Greece | 18th | Decathlon | 7768 pts |
| 1998 | European Indoor Championships | Valencia, Spain | 11th | Heptathlon | 5785 pts |
| 2000 | European Indoor Championships | Ghent, Belgium | 5th | Heptathlon | 5930 pts iNR |
| 2000 | Olympic Games | Sydney, Australia | 12th | Decathlon | 8136 pts NR |
| 2001 | World Indoor Championships | Lisbon, Portugal | 7th | Heptathlon | 5867 pts |
| 2001 | World Championships | Edmonton, Canada | 12th | Decathlon | 8155 pts |
| 2002 | European Indoor Championships | Vienna, Austria | 9th | Heptathlon | 5836 pts |
