= Marcin Niewiara =

Polish bobsledder

Marcin Piotr Niewiara (born April 2, 1981, in Wrocław) is a Polish bobsledder who has competed since 2006. At the 2010 Winter Olympics in Vancouver, he finished 14th in the four-man event and 16th in the two-man event.

Niewiara's best World Cup finish was also 14th in a four-man event in Park City, Utah in February 2009.
