= Stephen Moore (athlete) =

American decathlete (born 1975)

Personal information
- Born: August 13, 1975 (age 51) Fort Worth, Texas, United States

Sport
- Sport: Track and field
Medal record
Representing United States
Summer Universiade
Silver medal – second place	1999 Palma de Mallorca	Decathlon
Pan American Games
Gold medal – first place	2003 Santo Domingo	Decathlon

Stephen Moore (born August 13, 1975) is a retired male decathlete from the United States. He set his personal best (8085 points) at a meet in Arles, France, on June 7, 2004.

Stephen MOORE’s seasons bests

2008

discipline	performance	wind	date	Score	Competition & Venue
Heptathlon Short Track	5794pts		08 MAR 2008	1092	US Indoor Combined Events Championships, Chapel Hill, NC (USA) (i)
High Jump	2.04m		10 APR 2008	949	San Angelo David Noble Relays, San Angelo, TX (USA)
Long Jump	7.28 *m	+7.4	10 APR 2008	938	San Angelo David Noble Relays, San Angelo, TX (USA)
100 Metres	10.79 *	+4.0	10 APR 2008	925	San Angelo David Noble Relays, San Angelo, TX (USA)
60 Metres	7.12		02 FEB 2008	879	Houston Indoor Invitational, Houston, TX (USA) (i)
400 Metres	49.84		10 APR 2008	868	San Angelo David Noble Relays, San Angelo, TX (USA)
Shot Put	13.15m		10 APR 2008	714	San Angelo David Noble Relays, San Angelo, TX (USA)

2007

discipline	performance	wind	date	Score	Competition & Venue
Discus Throw	45.63m		11 MAY 2007	797	Lafayette Sun Belt Ch., Lafayette, LA (USA)
Shot Put	13.42m		12 MAY 2007	730	Lafayette Sun Belt Ch., Lafayette, LA (USA)
Hammer Throw	48.38m		12 MAY 2007	714	Lafayette Sun Belt Ch., Lafayette, LA (USA)
Pole Vault	3.47m		27 JAN 2007	588	Canton SLU Invitational, Canton, NY (USA) (i)
55 Metres	7.48		27 JAN 2007	501	Canton SLU Invitational, Canton, NY (USA) (i)

2005

discipline	performance	wind	date	Score	Competition & Venue
Heptathlon Short Track	5730pts		06 MAR 2005	1079	US Indoor Combined Events Championships, Chapel Hill, NC (USA) (i)
Decathlon	7655pts		24 JUN 2005	1073	US Championships, Carson, CA (USA)
400 Metres	48.21		23 JUN 2005	967	US Championships, Carson, CA (USA)
Pole Vault	4.90m		19 FEB 2005	967	Norman Sooner Invitational, Norman, OK (USA) (i)
Long Jump	7.15m		05 MAR 2005	954	US Indoor Combined Events Championships, Chapel Hill, NC (USA) (i)
55 Metres Hurdles	7.73		05 FEB 2005	949	Lubbock Wes Kittley Invitational, Lubbock, TX (USA) (i)
60 Metres Hurdles	8.31		06 MAR 2005	945	US Indoor Combined Events Championships, Chapel Hill, NC (USA) (i)
Long Jump	7.18 *m	+3.4	04 JUN 2005	941	Arles International Combined Events Meeting, Arles (FRA)
100 Metres	10.80 *	+2.2	04 JUN 2005	933	Arles International Combined Events Meeting, Arles (FRA)
High Jump	2.02m		04 JUN 2005	932	Arles International Combined Events Meeting, Arles (FRA)
110 Metres Hurdles	14.70 *	+3.1	05 JUN 2005	925	Arles International Combined Events Meeting, Arles (FRA)
60 Metres	7.04		05 MAR 2005	918	US Indoor Combined Events Championships, Chapel Hill, NC (USA) (i)
110 Metres Hurdles	14.96	-1.4	24 JUN 2005	908	US Championships, Carson, CA (USA)
100 Metres	11.22	-1.8	23 JUN 2005	832	US Championships, Carson, CA (USA)
Javelin Throw	55.68m		24 JUN 2005	757	US Championships, Carson, CA (USA)
Discus Throw	42.09m		24 JUN 2005	733	US Championships, Carson, CA (USA)
Shot Put	12.87m		23 JUN 2005	697	US Championships, Carson, CA (USA)
1000 Metres	2:43.44		06 MAR 2005	667	US Indoor Combined Events Championships, Chapel Hill, NC (USA) (i)
1000 Metres Short Track	2:43.44		06 MAR 2005	667	US Indoor Combined Events Championships, Chapel Hill, NC (USA) (i)
1500 Metres	4:43.58		24 JUN 2005	418	US Championships, Carson, CA (USA)

== Achievements ==
Year	Competition	Venue	Position	Notes
1999	Summer Universiade	Palma de Mallorca, Spain	2nd	Decathlon
2000	U.S. Olympic Track and Field Trials	Sacramento, California	DNF	Decathlon
2001	US National Indoor Championships	Atlanta, Georgia	1st	Heptathlon
2001	IAAF World Indoor Championships	Lisbon, Portugal	4th	Heptathlon
2002	Hypo-Meeting	Götzis, Austria	7th	Decathlon
2003	Hypo-Meeting	Götzis, Austria	6th	Decathlon
2003	Pan American Games	Santo Domingo, Dominican Republic	1st	Decathlon
2004	French Championships	Arles, France	2nd	Decathlon
2004	U.S. Olympic Track and Field Trials	Sacramento, California	5th	Decathlon
