= Attila Zsivoczky =

Hungarian decathlete

Attila Zsivoczky (born 29 April 1977 in Budapest) is a Hungarian track and field athlete, competing in decathlon. He has previously specialized in high jump, where he took a fourth place at the 1994 World Junior Championships in Athletics.

Zsivoczky was an All-American for the Kansas State Wildcats track and field team, placing runner-up in the decathlon at the 1998 NCAA Division I Outdoor Track and Field Championships and 1999 NCAA Division I Outdoor Track and Field Championships.

His father Gyula Zsivótzky was an Olympic champion in hammer throw.

== Achievements ==
Year	Competition	Venue	Position	Event	Notes
Representing Hungary
1994	World Junior Championships	Lisbon, Portugal	4th	High Jump	2.20 m
1996	World Junior Championships	Sydney, Australia	1st	Decathlon	7582 pts
1997	European U23 Championships	Turku, Finland	4th	Decathlon	7804 pts
1998	European Championships	Budapest, Hungary	16th	Decathlon	7876 pts
1999	European U23 Championships	Gothenburg, Sweden	1st	Decathlon	8379 pts
1999	World Championships	Seville, Spain	10th	Decathlon	8019 pts
2000	European Indoor Championships	Ghent, Belgium	4th	Heptathlon	6033 pts
2000	Hypo-Meeting	Götzis, Austria	5th	Decathlon	8554 pts
2000	Olympic Games	Sydney, Australia	8th	Decathlon	8277 pts
2001	Hypo-Meeting	Götzis, Austria	5th	Decathlon	8173 pts
2001	World Championships	Edmonton, Canada	4th	Decathlon	8371 pts
2002	European Indoor Championships	Vienna, Austria	5th	Heptathlon	5957 pts
2002	Hypo-Meeting	Götzis, Austria	4th	Decathlon	8175 pts
2004	Hypo-Meeting	Götzis, Austria	9th	Decathlon	8126 pts
2004	Olympic Games	Athens, Greece	6th	Decathlon	8287 pts
2005	European Indoor Championships	Madrid, Spain	5th	Heptathlon	6024 pts
2005	Hypo-Meeting	Götzis, Austria	2nd	Decathlon	8480 pts
2005	World Championships	Helsinki, Finland	3rd	Decathlon	8385 pts
2005	Décastar	Talence, France	7th	Decathlon	8000 pts
2006	Hypo-Meeting	Götzis, Austria	5th	Decathlon	8204 pts
2006	European Championships	Gothenburg, Sweden	2nd	Decathlon	8356 pts
2007	World Championships	Osaka, Japan	12th	Decathlon	8017 pts
2008	Olympic Games	Beijing, China	—	Decathlon	DNF
2014	European Championships	Zurich, Switzerland	17th	Decathlon	7646 pts

== Awards ==
- Hungarian athlete of the Year (3): 2001, 2005, 2006
