= Sebastian Knabe =

German decathlete

Sebastian Knabe (born 13 October 1978) is a retired German decathlete. His personal best score was 8151 points, achieved in June 2001 in Ratingen.

== Achievements ==
Year	Competition	Venue	Position	Event	Notes
Representing Germany
1999	European U23 Championships	Gothenburg, Sweden	10th	Decathlon	7366 pts
2001	World Championships	Edmonton, Canada	—	Decathlon	DNF
2002	European Championships	Munich, Germany	16th	Decathlon	7036 pts
2003	Hypo-Meeting	Götzis, Austria	7th	Decathlon	7958 pts
2004	Hypo-Meeting	Götzis, Austria	—	Decathlon	DNF
