= Klaus Ambrosch =

Austrian decathlete

Klaus Ambrosch (born 23 May 1973 in Knittelfeld) is an Austrian decathlete. His personal best result was 8122 points, achieved in July 2001 at the Hypo-Meeting in Götzis. His life partner is the German long jumper Bianca Kappler.

Representing the Arizona Wildcats track and field team, Ambrosch won the 1998 NCAA Division I Outdoor Track and Field Championships in the decathlon.

== Achievements ==
Year	Competition	Venue	Position	Event
1996	Hypo-Meeting	Götzis, Austria	24th	Decathlon
1997	Hypo-Meeting	Götzis, Austria	19th	Decathlon
1999	Hypo-Meeting	Götzis, Austria	DNF	Decathlon
2000	Hypo-Meeting	Götzis, Austria	11th	Decathlon
2000	Olympic Games	Sydney, Australia	18th	Decathlon
2001	Hypo-Meeting	Götzis, Austria	6th	Decathlon
2001	World Championships	Edmonton, Canada	DNF	Decathlon
2001	Universiade	Beijing, China	7th	Decathlon
2002	European Indoor Championships	Vienna, Austria	12th	Heptathlon
2002	Hypo-Meeting	Götzis, Austria	12th	Decathlon
2002	European Championships	Munich, Germany	12th	Decathlon
2003	Hypo-Meeting	Götzis, Austria	5th	Decathlon
