= Chiel Warners =

Dutch decathlete

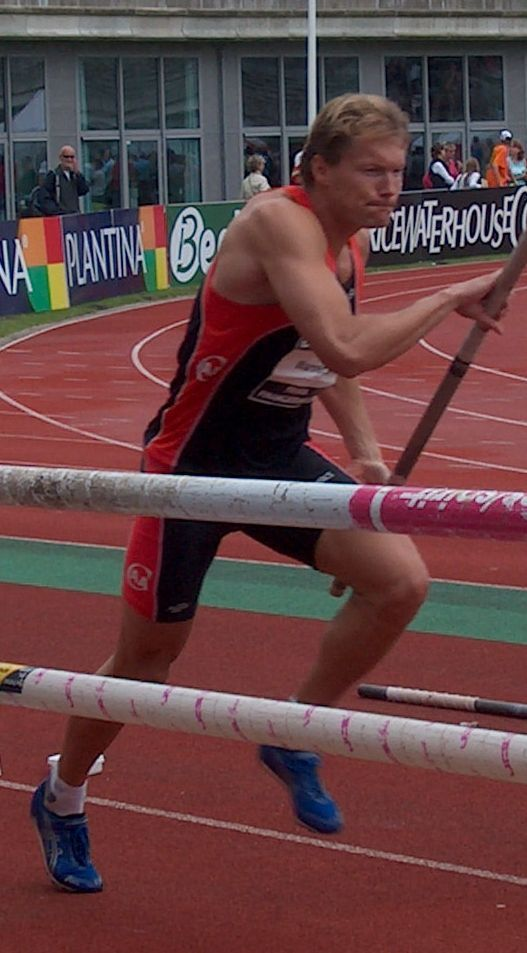
- Chiel Warners in 2007

Personal information
- Born: 2 April 1978 (age 48) Harderwijk, Gelderland, Netherlands

Sport
- Sport: Decathlon
Medal record
Representing Netherlands
World Junior Championships
Bronze medal – third place	1996 Sydney	Decathlon
European Junior Championships
Gold medal – first place	1997 Ljubljana	Decathlon

Chiel Mathijs Warners (born 2 April 1978) is a former Dutch decathlete. He competed in the men's decathlon at the 2004 Summer Olympics.

== Achievements ==
Year	Competition	Venue	Position	Event	Notes
Representing Netherlands
1996	World Junior Championships	Sydney, Australia	3rd	Decathlon	7368 pts
1997	European Junior Championships	Ljubljana, Slovenia	1st	Decathlon	7664 pts
1997	Universiade	Catania, Italy	–	Decathlon	DNF
1999	Hypo-Meeting	Götzis, Austria	5th	Decathlon	8363 pts
1999	European U23 Championships	Gothenburg, Sweden	—	Decathlon	DNF
1999	World Championships	Seville, Spain	—	Decathlon	DNF
2000	European Indoor Championships	Ghent, Belgium	7th	Heptathlon	5830 pts
2000	Hypo-Meeting	Götzis, Austria	—	Decathlon	DNF
2001	Hypo-Meeting	Götzis, Austria	8th	Decathlon	8085 pts
2001	World Championships	Edmonton, Canada	16th	Decathlon	7916 pts
2002	Hypo-Meeting	Götzis, Austria	—	Decathlon	DNF
2003	Hypo-Meeting	Götzis, Austria	11th	Decathlon	7739 pts
2003	World Championships	Paris, France	11th	Decathlon	7753 pts
2004	Hypo-Meeting	Götzis, Austria	5th	Decathlon	8301 pts
2004	Olympic Games	Athens, Greece	5th	Decathlon	8343 pts
2005	European Indoor Championships	Madrid, Spain	4th	Heptathlon	6055 pts
2005	Hypo-Meeting	Götzis, Austria	12th	Decathlon	7836 pts

Awards
Preceded by Kamiel Maase	Herman van Leeuwen Cup; 2004	Succeeded by Rens Blom as Men's Dutch Athlete of the Year
