= Laurent Hernu =

French decathlete

Laurent Hernu (born 22 August 1976 in Creil, Oise) is a French decathlete. In 2015, Hernu coached about 20 other athletes, including French sprint athlete Marie Gayot.

== Achievements ==
Year	Competition	Venue	Position	Event	Notes
Representing France
2000	Olympic Games	Sydney, Australia	19th	Decathlon	
2001	World Championships	Edmonton, Canada	8th	Decathlon	
2002	European Championships	Munich, Germany	7th	Decathlon	
2003	World Indoor Championships	Birmingham, England	7th	Heptathlon	
2003	Hypo-Meeting	Götzis, Austria	10th	Decathlon	
2003	World Championships	Paris, France	5th	Decathlon	
2004	Olympic Games	Athens, Greece	7th	Decathlon	
2005	European Indoor Championships	Madrid, Spain	7th	Heptathlon	
2005	World Championships	Helsinki, Finland	DNS	Decathlon	
