= 2026 Women's Decathlon World Championships =

- Venue: Robert Kahn Track and Fred Shults Field, Oberlin, Ohio
- Dates: 8–9 August 2026
- Competitors: 26 from 7 nations
- Winning points: 7900

Medalists
gold medal	Camryn Newton-Smith	Australia
silver medal	Noémie Desailly	France
bronze medal	Nikki Boon	Netherlands

The third edition of the Women's Decathlon World Championships was held in Oberlin, Ohio, on 8 and 9 August 2026. Australian Camryn Newton-Smith won the gold medal, with Noémie Desailly of France and defending champion Nikki Boon of the Netherlands winning the silver and bronze medals.

== Background ==
The event was the third global women's decathlon championship. It was organized by Lauren Kuntz. It was the first time that a two-hour broadcast package was put together for the event on PlutoTV's All Women’s Sports Network, ending with a live showing of the 1500 metres final event.

The event was originally scheduled to be held at the Olympic training center in Geneva, Ohio, where the previous two championships were also held. However, one month before the event organizers were told they would have to find another venue due to the Patriot Games taking place at the same location. They relocated to Oberlin College's track in Oberlin, Ohio.

The field featured a number of debutantes, including French heptathlon champion Esther Condé-Turpin and Australian Olympian Camryn Newton-Smith. These athletes were contrasted with more experienced decathletes Noemie Desailly and Roseva Bidois of France. In addition, all of the 2025 event's medalists were returning to the 2026 edition. A group associated with the event created a phased transition plan for the women's decathlon to be included in a World Athletic-sanctioned World Championship in 2030 and at the 2032 Summer Olympics.

== Schedule ==
The women's decathlon took place over two consecutive days, with five events each day.

Date	Event
8 August 2026	100 metres Long jump Shot put High jump 400 metres
9 August 2026	100 metres hurdles Discus throw Pole vault Javelin throw 1500 metres

== Records ==
Prior to this competition, the existing world, championship, and area records were as follows.

World record	Austra Skujytė (LTU)	8358	Columbia, Missouri, United States	14-15 April 2005
Championship record	Nikki Boon (NED)	7451	Geneva, Ohio, United States	16-17 August 2025
World leading	Adeline Audigier (FRA)	6660	Blois, France	11-12 July 2026

Area	Points	Athlete	Nation
Africa (records)	7014	Margaret Simpson	Ghana
Asia (records)	7798	Irina Naumenko	Kazakhstan
Europe (records)	8358 WR	Austra Skujytė	Lithuania
North, Central America and Caribbean (records)	8246	Jordan Gray	United States
Oceania (records)	5927	Meagan Rentsch	Australia
South America (records)	6570	Andrea Bordalejo	Argentina

== Results ==
=== 100 metres ===
The 100 metres was started on 8 August 2026.

Wind readings: 1.4

Rank	Heat	Name	Nationality	Time	Points	Notes
1	1	Esther Conde-Turpin	France	11.80	991	WDB
2	1	Camryn Newton-Smith	Australia	11.83	985	
3	1	Hannah Hill	United States	11.89	973	
4	1	Laura Mathews	United States	11.92	968	
5	1	Noemie Desailly	France	12.01	950	
6	2	Nikki Boon	Netherlands	12.05	943	
7	2	Roseva Bidois	France	12.07	939	
8	1	Alysa Henry	United States	12.20	914	
9	2	Uxia Pereira Alonso	Spain	12.33	890	
10	2	Jordyn Bruce	United States	12.49	860	
11	3	Julia Jongejeugd	Netherlands	12.60	840	
11	3	Maria Sartin	New Zealand	12.60	840	
13	3	Jessica Swalve	United States	12.64	833	
13	1	Suraia Amer	Palestine	12.64	833	
15	2	Katie Straus	United States	12.66	830	
16	4	Robin Selkirk	Canada	12.68	826	
17	3	Aubrey Phillips	United States	12.69	824	
18	4	Delaney Straus	United States	12.88	790	
19	4	Elisabeth Eichinger	United States	12.89	789	
20	3	Suzanne Fournier	France	12.95	778	
21	4	Adeline Audigier	France	13.11	750	
22	4	Amber Nyssen	Australia	13.20	735	
23	4	Corinn Brewer	United States	13.22	731	
23	3	Giselle Burgos	Mexico	13.22	731	
25	2	Raphäele Rolnin	France	13.37	706	
26	2	Madison Luthy	United States	13.55	676	

=== Long jump ===
The long jump was started on 8 August.

Rank	Group	Athlete	Nation	#1	#2	#3	Distance	Points	Notes	Overall points	Overall rank
1	1	Camryn Newton-Smith	Australia	6.17 (+0.2 m/s)	P	6.14 (+0.1 m/s)	6.17 (+0.2 m/s)	902		1887	1
2	1	Hannah Hill	United States	5.87	6.10 (+2.3 m/s)	F	6.10 (+2.3 m/s)	880		1853	2
3	1	Noemie Desailly	France	6.09	5.81 (+0.6 m/s)	5.94 (+1.5 m/s)	6.09 (+0.0 m/s)	877		1827	4
4	1	Roseva Bidois	France	5.69 (+2.4 m/s)	5.77 (+0.2 m/s)	6.03 (+2.8 m/s)	6.03 (+2.8 m/s)	859		1798	5
5	1	Esther Conde-Turpin	France	5.96 (+2.4 m/s)	5.92 (+3.9 m/s)	F	5.96 (+2.4 m/s)	837		1828	3
6	1	Alysa Henry	United States	F	5.70 (+1.6 m/s)	5.78 (+1.5 m/s)	5.78 (+1.5 m/s)	783		1697	7
7	1	Nikki Boon	Netherlands	F	5.54 (+2.1 m/s)	5.77 (+1.3 m/s)	5.77 (+1.3 m/s)	780		1723	6
8	1	Julia Jongejeugd	Netherlands	5.33 (+3.7 m/s)	5.56 (+2.6 m/s)	5.69 (+0.3 m/s)	5.69 (+0.3 m/s)	756		1596	9
9	1	Jordyn Bruce	United States	F	5.52	F	5.52 (+0.0 m/s)	706		1566	10
10	1	Adeline Audigier	France	5.26 (+1.7 m/s)	5.10 (+1.4 m/s)	5.49 (+1.6 m/s)	5.49 (+1.6 m/s)	697		1447	15
11	2	Delaney Straus	United States	5.21 (+3.1 m/s)	5.44 (+0.5 m/s)	5.30 (+1.0 m/s)	5.44 (+0.5 m/s)	683		1473	14
12	2	Maria Sartin	New Zealand	5.16 (+1.0 m/s)	5.40 (+3.2 m/s)	5.19 (+0.8 m/s)	5.40 (+3.2 m/s)	671		1511	11
13	2	Jessica Swalve	United States	5.19 (+0.5 m/s)	5.25 (+0.8 m/s)	5.30 (+0.5 m/s)	5.30 (+0.5 m/s)	643		1476	12
14	1	Laura Mathews	United States	5.14 (+0.3 m/s)	5.29	5.26 (+2.3 m/s)	5.29 (+0.0 m/s)	640		1608	8
15	2	Madison Luthy	United States	5.03 (+0.4 m/s)	5.28 (+1.2 m/s)	5.05 (+0.1 m/s)	5.28 (+1.2 m/s)	637		1313	23
16	2	Raphäele Rolnin	France	4.98 (+0.8 m/s)	5.15 (+1.5 m/s)	5.22 (+2.0 m/s)	5.22 (+2.0 m/s)	620		1326	21
16	2	Robin Selkirk	Canada	5.03 (+2.1 m/s)	F	5.22 (+2.3 m/s)	5.22 (+2.3 m/s)	620		1446	16
18	2	Aubrey Phillips	United States	4.63 (+0.3 m/s)	F	5.19 (+1.8 m/s)	5.19 (+1.8 m/s)	612		1436	17
19	2	Corinn Brewer	United States	5.03 (+0.7 m/s)	5.12	4.97	5.12 (+0.0 m/s)	592		1323	22
20	2	Uxia Pereira Alonso	Spain	5.09 (+1.9 m/s)	4.93 (+1.0 m/s)	5.03 (+0.9 m/s)	5.09 (+1.9 m/s)	584		1474	13
20	1	Elisabeth Eichinger	United States	5.09 (+1.1 m/s)	F	5.03 (+3.0 m/s)	5.09 (+1.1 m/s)	584		1373	19
22	2	Suzanne Fournier	France	F	5.08	F	5.08 (+0.0 m/s)	581		1359	20
22	2	Suraia Amer	Palestine	4.62 (+0.3 m/s)	5.08 (+2.8 m/s)	4.99 (+1.9 m/s)	5.08 (+2.8 m/s)	581		1414	18
24	2	Amber Nyssen	Australia	F	5.01 (+2.1 m/s)	5.06 (+2.3 m/s)	5.06 (+2.3 m/s)	576		1311	24
25	2	Giselle Burgos	Mexico	4.50 (+1.6 m/s)	4.74 (+2.4 m/s)	4.67 (+0.6 m/s)	4.74 (+2.4 m/s)	490		1221	25
26	1	Katie Straus	United States	3.63 (+2.9 m/s)	P	P	3.63 (+2.9 m/s)	0		830	26

=== Shot put ===
The shot put was started in one group on 8 August.

Rank	Athlete	Nation	#1	#2	#3	Distance	Points	Notes	Overall points	Overall rank
1	Roseva Bidois	France	13.07	14.04	14.02	14.04	797		2595	3
2	Noemie Desailly	France	13.26	13.91	13.16	13.91	788		2615	1
3	Esther Conde-Turpin	France	13.32	F	13.42	13.42	755		2583	4
4	Nikki Boon	Netherlands	12.40	13.27	13.10	13.27	745		2468	5
5	Camryn Newton-Smith	Australia	12.30	12.86	12.61	12.86	718		2605	2
6	Aubrey Phillips	United States	11.62	12.13	12.46	12.46	692		2128	12
7	Jessica Swalve	United States	11.97	11.71	12.25	12.25	678		2154	11
8	Alysa Henry	United States	11.97	F	F	11.97	659		2356	7
9	Jordyn Bruce	United States	11.85	11.24	11.21	11.85	611		2177	10
10	Laura Mathews	United States	10.67	11.66	10.64	11.66	639		2247	8
10	Julia Jongejeugd	Netherlands	11.66	11.52	11.25	11.66	639		2235	9
12	Hannah Hill	United States	11.08	11.15	9.71	11.15	605		2458	6
13	Robin Selkirk	Canada	10.04	9.81	10.53	10.53	564		2010	13
14	Elisabeth Eichinger	United States	10.45	9.75	10.51	10.51	563		1936	17
15	Giselle Burgos	Mexico	F	10.44	10.20	10.44	558		1779	24
16	Raphäele Rolnin	France	F	10.43	F	10.43	558		1884	20
17	Adeline Audigier	France	9.27	10.28	10.37	10.37	554		2001	15
18	Madison Luthy	United States	9.08	10.16	9.73	10.16	540		1853	22
18	Suzanne Fournier	France	9.91	10.16	10.16	10.16	540		1899	18
20	Corinn Brewer	United States	9.41	10.12	9.89	10.12	537		1860	21
21	Uxia Pereira Alonso	Spain	9.92	10.01	F	10.01	530		2004	14
22	Amber Nyssen	Australia	F	9.06	8.59	9.06	468		1779	24
23	Maria Sartin	New Zealand	8.51	8.46	8.74	8.74	447		1958	16
24	Delaney Straus	United States	8.40	F	8.36	8.40	425		1898	19
25	Suraia Amer	Palestine	8.37	7.90	8.14	8.37	423		1837	23
--	Katie Straus	United States	--	--	--	--	0		830	26

=== High jump ===
The high jump was started on 8 August.

Rank	Group	Name	Nation	1.18	1.21	1.24	1.27	1.30	1.33	1.36	1.39	1.42	1.45	1.48	1.51	1.54	1.57	1.60	1.63	1.66	1.69	1.72	1.75	1.78	1.81	Result	Points	Notes	Overall points	Overall rank
1	2	Camryn Newton-Smith	Australia	–	–	–	–	–	–	–	–	–	–	–	–	–	–	–	–	O	O	XO	XO	XXX	–	1.75	916		3521	1
5	2	Alysa Henry	United States	PPP	PPP	PPP	PPP	PPP	PPP	PPP	PPP	PPP	PPP	PPP	PPP	PPP	PPP	PPP	O	XO	O	O	O	XXX	–	1.75	916		3272	5
2	2	Esther Conde-Turpin	France	–	–	–	–	–	–	–	–	–	–	–	–	–	–	–	–	O	XO	XXX	–	–	–	1.69	842		3425	2
12	2	Adeline Audigier	France	–	–	–	–	–	–	–	–	–	–	–	O	PPP	PPP	O	O	O	XO	XXX	–	–	–	1.69	842		2843	12
9	2	Aubrey Phillips	United States	–	–	–	–	–	–	–	–	–	–	–	–	O	O	O	XXO	O	XXX	–	–	–	–	1.66	806		2934	9
3	2	Roseva Bidois	France	–	–	–	–	–	–	–	–	–	–	–	–	O	O	O	XXX	–	–	–	–	–	–	1.60	736		3331	3
10	2	Jordyn Bruce	United States	–	–	–	–	–	–	–	–	–	–	O	O	O	O	XO	XXX	–	–	–	–	–	–	1.60	736		2913	10
14	2	Robin Selkirk	Canada	–	–	–	–	–	–	–	–	–	–	–	–	O	O	XXO	XXX	–	–	–	–	–	–	1.60	736		2746	14
6	2	Nikki Boon	Netherlands	–	–	–	–	–	–	–	–	–	–	O	O	O	XO	XXX	–	–	–	–	–	–	–	1.57	701		3169	6
4	2	Noemie Desailly	France	–	–	–	–	–	–	–	–	–	O	O	XO	O	XXO	XXX	–	–	–	–	–	–	–	1.57	701		3316	4
17	1	Madison Luthy	United States	PPP	PPP	PPP	PPP	PPP	PPP	PPP	PPP	PPP	O	PPP	O	O	O	XXX	–	–	–	–	–	–	–	1.57	701		2554	17
16	1	Delaney Straus	United States	PPP	PPP	PPP	PPP	PPP	PPP	PPP	O	PPP	O	O	XXO	O	O	XXX	–	–	–	–	–	–	–	1.57	701		2599	16
8	2	Julia Jongejeugd	Netherlands	–	–	–	–	–	–	–	–	–	–	–	XXO	O	O	XXX	–	–	–	–	–	–	–	1.57	701		2936	8
7	1	Hannah Hill	United States	PPP	PPP	PPP	PPP	PPP	PPP	PPP	PPP	O	O	O	XXO	XO	XXX	–	–	–	–	–	–	–	–	1.54	666		3124	7
19	1	Corinn Brewer	United States	PPP	PPP	PPP	PPP	PPP	PPP	PPP	PPP	O	PPP	O	PPP	O	XXX	–	–	–	–	–	–	–	–	1.54	666		2526	19
18	1	Raphäele Rolnin	France	PPP	PPP	PPP	PPP	PPP	PPP	PPP	PPP	O	PPP	O	PPP	O	XXX	–	–	–	–	–	–	–	–	1.54	666		2550	18
15	1	Uxia Pereira Alonso	Spain	PPP	PPP	PPP	PPP	PPP	O	O	O	O	XO	XO	O	O	XXX	–	–	–	–	–	–	–	–	1.54	666		2670	15
13	1	Jessica Swalve	United States	PPP	PPP	PPP	PPP	PPP	PPP	PPP	PPP	O	O	O	XXO	XXX	–	–	–	–	–	–	–	–	–	1.51	632		2786	13
11	2	Laura Mathews	United States	PPP	PPP	PPP	PPP	PPP	PPP	PPP	PPP	O	PPP	XO	XXX	–	–	–	–	–	–	–	–	–	–	1.48	599		2846	11
20	1	Suzanne Fournier	France	PPP	PPP	PPP	PPP	PPP	PPP	PPP	PPP	O	O	O	XXX	–	–	–	–	–	–	–	–	–	–	1.48	599		2498	20
23	1	Amber Nyssen	Australia	PPP	PPP	PPP	PPP	PPP	PPP	PPP	PPP	O	XXO	XXO	XXX	–	–	–	–	–	–	–	–	–	–	1.48	599		2378	23
21	1	Maria Sartin	New Zealand	PPP	PPP	PPP	O	O	O	O	XO	XO	XXX	–	–	–	–	–	–	–	–	–	–	–	–	1.42	534		2492	21
22	1	Elisabeth Eichinger	United States	PPP	PPP	PPP	PPP	PPP	PPP	PPP	O	O	XXX	–	–	–	–	–	–	–	–	–	–	–	–	1.42	534		2470	22
25	1	Giselle Burgos	Mexico	PPP	PPP	PPP	PPP	O	O	O	XXX	–	–	–	–	–	–	–	–	–	–	–	–	–	–	1.36	470		2249	25
24	1	Suraia Amer	Palestine	PPP	O	O	XO	XO	O	XXX	–	–	–	–	–	–	–	–	–	–	–	–	–	–	–	1.33	439		2276	24
26	2	Katie Straus	United States	–	–	–	–	–	–	–	–	–	–	–	–	–	–	–	–	–	–	–	–	–	–	--	0		830	26

=== 400 metres ===
The 400 metres was started on 8 August.

Rank	Heat	Name	Nationality	Time	Points	Notes	Overall points	Overall rank
1	1	Hannah Hill	United States	54.82	920	WDB (Note: Marked by World Athletics, but the Womens Decathlon Association recognizes 54.0h by Ester Goossens as decathlon best.)	4044	5
2	2	Camryn Newton-Smith	Australia	55.41	893		4414	1
3	1	Noemie Desailly	France	55.59	885		4201	3
4	1	Roseva Bidois	France	56.04	865		4196	4
5	1	Esther Conde-Turpin	France	56.07	864		4289	2
6	1	Nikki Boon	Netherlands	56.35	852		4021	6
7	1	Maria Sartin	New Zealand	56.84	831		3323	16
8	3	Jessica Swalve	United States	58.23	772		3558	11
9	2	Corinn Brewer	United States	59.02	739		3265	18
10	3	Delaney Straus	United States	59.26	729		3328	15
11	2	Alysa Henry	United States	59.60	715		3987	7
12	2	Julia Jongejeugd	Netherlands	1:00.03	698		3634	8
13	3	Adeline Audigier	France	1:00.20	691		3534	12
14	2	Uxia Pereira Alonso	Spain	1:00.21	691		3361	14
15	2	Jordyn Bruce	United States	1:00.24	690		3603	10
16	4	Suraia Amer	Palestine	1:00.32	687		2963	24
17	4	Aubrey Phillips	United States	1:00.35	685		3619	9
18	4	Amber Nyssen	Australia	1:00.52	679		3057	23
19	4	Suzanne Fournier	France	1:00.71	671		3169	19
20	3	Giselle Burgos	Mexico	1:00.95	662		2911	25
21	3	Elisabeth Eichinger	United States	1:01.24	650		3120	21
22	3	Robin Selkirk	Canada	1:01.70	633		3379	13
23	4	Madison Luthy	United States	1:02.25	612		3166	20
24	4	Raphäele Rolnin	France	1:05.02	512		3062	22
25	2	Laura Mathews	United States	1:06.94	447		3293	17
--	1	Katie Straus	United States	--	0		830	26

=== 100 metres hurdles ===
The 100 metres hurdles began on 9 August.

Wind readings: 0.3.

Rank	Heat	Athlete	Nation	Time	Points	Notes	Overall points	Overall rank
1	1	Esther Conde-Turpin	France	13.39	1066	WDB	4289	2
2	1	Camryn Newton-Smith	Australia	13.61	1034		4414	1
3	1	Uxia Pereira Alonso	Spain	13.91	991		3361	14
4	1	Noemie Desailly	France	14.13	960		4201	3
5	1	Julia Jongejeugd	Netherlands	14.23	946		3634	8
6	1	Jordyn Bruce	United States	14.24	945		3603	10
7	3	Hannah Hill	United States	14.33	932		4044	5
8	2	Nikki Boon	Netherlands	14.34	931		4021	6
9	2	Alysa Henry	United States	14.51	907		3987	7
10	2	Roseva Bidois	France	14.53	905		4196	4
11	2	Jessica Swalve	United States	14.68	884		3558	11
12	2	Robin Selkirk	Canada	14.73	878		3379	13
13	3	Adeline Audigier	France	14.84	863		3534	12
14	4	Aubrey Phillips	United States	15.07	832		3619	9
15	3	Giselle Burgos	Mexico	15.27	806		2911	25
16	4	Delaney Straus	United States	15.50	777		3328	15
17	2	Elisabeth Eichinger	United States	15.52	774		3120	21
18	3	Madison Luthy	United States	15.55	770		3166	20
19	4	Maria Sartin	New Zealand	15.66	756		3323	16
20	3	Corinn Brewer	United States	15.69	753		3265	18
21	4	Amber Nyssen	Australia	16.38	668		3057	23
22	4	Suzanne Fournier	France	16.40	666		3169	19
23	3	Raphäele Rolnin	France	16.53	651		3062	22
24	4	Suraia Amer	Palestine	20.76	242		2963	24
--	1	Laura Mathews	United States	--	0		3293	17
--	2	Katie Straus	United States	--	0		830	26

=== Discus throw ===
The discus throw took place in one group on 9 August.

Rank	Athlete	Nation	#1	#2	#3	Distance	Points	Notes	Overall points	Overall rank
1	Roseva Bidois	France	44.19	43.46	F	44.19	736		5837	3
2	Noemie Desailly	France	F	F	39.65	39.65	647		5808	4
3	Nikki Boon	Netherlands	F	36.25	39.54	39.54	645		5597	5
4	Jordyn Bruce	United States	F	26.72	37.25	37.25	601		5149	9
5	Julia Jongejeugd	Netherlands	F	36.47	36.81	36.81	592		5172	8
6	Camryn Newton-Smith	Australia	30.01	31.15	34.22	34.22	543		5991	1
7	Hannah Hill	United States	24.87	33.96	27.37	33.96	538		5514	6
8	Esther Conde-Turpin	France	21.62	33.15	32.95	33.15	522		5877	2
9	Jessica Swalve	United States	28.69	32.90	32.62	32.90	517		4959	10
10	Raphäele Rolnin	France	32.82	F	F	32.82	516		4229	21
11	Adeline Audigier	France	32.54	30.60	30.48	32.54	511		4908	11
12	Suzanne Fournier	France	32.46	F	31.97	32.46	509		4344	19
13	Alysa Henry	United States	28.55	31.58	31.98	31.98	500		5394	7
14	Corinn Brewer	United States	30.09	29.27	30.61	30.61	474		4492	16
15	Delaney Straus	United States	F	30.08	29.20	30.08	464		4569	15
16	Madison Luthy	United States	17.58	F	27.64	27.64	418		4354	18
17	Aubrey Phillips	United States	26.30	27.13	27.60	27.60	417		4868	12
18	Elisabeth Eichinger	United States	F	25.83	26.17	26.17	391		4285	20
19	Robin Selkirk	Canada	22.84	25.50	23.86	25.50	378		4635	13
20	Giselle Burgos	Mexico	F	24.98	F	24.98	369		4086	22
21	Maria Sartin	New Zealand	23.12	24.77	F	24.77	365		4444	17
22	Amber Nyssen	Australia	18.05	F	19.97	19.97	277		4002	23
23	Suraia Amer	Palestine	17.19	18.31	F	18.31	248		3453	24
24	Uxia Pereira Alonso	Spain	F	F	16.83	16.83	221		4573	14
--	Laura Mathews	United States				--	0		3293	25
--	Katie Straus	United States				--	0		830	26

=== Pole vault ===
The pole vault took place on 9 August.

Rank	Group	Athlete	Nation	1.50	1.60	1.70	1.80	1.90	2.00	2.10	2.20	2.30	2.40	2.50	2.60	2.70	2.80	2.90	3.00	3.10	3.20	3.30	3.40	3.50	3.60	3.70	3.80	3.90	4.00	Height	Points	Notes	Overall points	Overall rank
5	1	Alysa Henry	United States	–	–	–	–	–	–	–	–	–	–	–	–	–	–	–	–	–	PPP	–	PPP	O	O	XO	XO	XXO	XXX	3.90	930		6324	5
4	1	Nikki Boon	Netherlands	–	–	–	–	–	–	–	–	–	–	–	–	PPP	O	–	O	O	XO	O	O	O	XXX	–	–	–	–	3.50	761		6358	4
1	1	Camryn Newton-Smith	Australia	–	–	–	–	–	–	–	–	–	–	–	–	–	PPP	XO	XO	XO	O	XO	XXO	XXO	XXX	–	–	–	–	3.50	761		6752	1
3	1	Noemie Desailly	France	–	–	–	–	–	–	–	–	–	–	–	–	–	–	–	–	–	O	PPP	O	XXX	–	–	–	–	–	3.40	721		6529	3
2	1	Roseva Bidois	France	–	–	–	–	–	–	–	–	–	–	–	–	–	–	–	–	PPP	PPP	XO	O	XXX	–	–	–	–	–	3.40	721		6558	2
14	1	Suzanne Fournier	France	–	–	–	–	–	–	–	–	–	–	–	–	–	–	PPP	O	O	O	O	XO	XXX	–	–	–	–	–	3.40	721		5065	14
7	1	Jordyn Bruce	United States	–	–	–	–	–	–	–	–	–	–	–	–	PPP	–	PPP	O	XO	O	XXO	XXX	–	–	–	–	–	–	3.30	680		5829	7
13	1	Corinn Brewer	United States	–	–	–	–	–	–	–	–	–	–	–	–	–	–	–	PPP	O	PPP	XXX	–	–	–	–	–	–	–	3.10	602		5094	13
18	1	Madison Luthy	United States	–	–	–	–	–	–	–	–	–	–	–	–	–	PPP	–	O	PPP	XXX	–	–	–	–	–	–	–	–	3.00	563		4917	18
12	2	Aubrey Phillips	United States	PPP	PPP	PPP	O	PPP	O	PPP	O	PPP	O	PPP	O	O	XXO	O	XXX	–	–	–	–	–	–	–	–	–	–	2.90	526		5394	12
10	1	Jessica Swalve	United States	–	–	–	–	–	–	–	–	PPP	XO	XO	O	O	XO	XXX	–	–	–	–	–	–	–	–	–	–	–	2.80	488		5447	10
11	1	Adeline Audigier	France	–	–	–	–	–	–	–	–	–	PPP	PPP	O	O	O	XXX	–	–	–	–	–	–	–	–	–	–	–	2.80	488		5396	11
24	2	Suraia Amer	Palestine	PPP	PPP	PPP	PPP	O	O	O	O	O	XXO	XO	XXO	XXX	–	–	–	–	–	–	–	–	–	–	–	–	–	2.60	417		3870	24
15	1	Robin Selkirk	Canada	–	–	–	–	–	–	–	O	O	O	XO	XO	XXX	–	–	–	–	–	–	–	–	–	–	–	–	–	2.60	417		5052	15
16	2	Delaney Straus	United States	PPP	PPP	PPP	PPP	PPP	PPP	O	PPP	O	O	XXO	XXX	–	–	–	–	–	–	–	–	–	–	–	–	–	–	2.50	382		4951	16
9	2	Julia Jongejeugd	Netherlands	PPP	PPP	PPP	PPP	PPP	PPP	PPP	O	PPP	O	O	XXX	–	–	–	–	–	–	–	–	–	–	–	–	–	–	2.50	382		5554	9
21	2	Giselle Burgos	Mexico	PPP	PPP	PPP	PPP	O	O	O	O	O	O	XXO	XXX	–	–	–	–	–	–	–	–	–	–	–	–	–	–	2.50	382		4468	21
22	2	Amber Nyssen	Australia	PPP	PPP	PPP	PPP	PPP	PPP	O	XO	O	O	XO	XXX	–	–	–	–	–	–	–	–	–	–	–	–	–	–	2.50	382		4384	22
19	2	Maria Sartin	New Zealand	O	PPP	PPP	PPP	O	O	O	XO	O	XO	XXX	–	–	–	–	–	–	–	–	–	–	–	–	–	–	–	2.40	348		4792	19
17	2	Uxia Pereira Alonso	Spain	O	PPP	PPP	PPP	O	PPP	O	XO	O	O	XXX	–	–	–	–	–	–	–	–	–	–	–	–	–	–	–	2.40	348		4921	17
20	2	Elisabeth Eichinger	United States	PPP	PPP	PPP	PPP	PPP	PPP	PPP	XO	O	O	XXX	–	–	–	–	–	–	–	–	–	–	–	–	–	–	–	2.40	348		4633	20
6	1	Esther Conde-Turpin	France	–	–	–	–	–	–	–	XO	XO	XXX	–	–	–	–	–	–	–	–	–	–	–	–	–	–	–	–	2.30	315		6192	6
8	2	Hannah Hill	United States	XXO	PPP	XO	–	–	–	–	–	–	–	–	–	–	–	–	–	–	–	–	–	–	–	–	–	–	–	1.70	136		5650	8
23	1	Raphäele Rolnin	France	–	–	–	–	–	–	–	–	–	–	–	–	PPP	XXX	–	–	–	–	–	–	–	–	–	–	–	–	--	0		4229	23
25	2	Laura Mathews	United States	PPP	PPP	PPP	PPP	PPP	PPP	PPP	PPP	PPP	–	–	–	–	–	–	–	–	–	–	–	–	–	–	–	–	–	--	0		3293	25
26	1	Katie Straus	United States	–	–	–	–	–	–	–	–	–	–	–	–	–	–	–	–	–	–	–	–	–	–	–	–	–	–	--	0		830	26

=== Javelin throw ===
The javelin throw took place in one flight on 9 August.

Rank	Athlete	Nation	#1	#2	#3	Distance	Points	Notes	Overall points	Overall rank
1	Esther Conde-Turpin	France	37.00	43.64	43.13	43.64	737		2583	4
2	Alysa Henry	United States	43.49	43.59	42.83	43.59	736		2356	7
3	Delaney Straus	United States	37.66	39.64	40.23	40.23	672		1898	19
4	Hannah Hill	United States	34.95	39.02	F	39.02	649		2458	6
5	Jessica Swalve	United States	32.73	38.37	36.93	38.37	636		2154	11
6	Aubrey Phillips	United States	34.27	31.21	37.59	37.59	621		2128	12
7	Camryn Newton-Smith	Australia	37.15	35.08	P	37.15	613		2605	2
8	Julia Jongejeugd	Netherlands	33.50	35.88	32.35	35.88	588		2235	9
9	Nikki Boon	Netherlands	33.36	32.07	35.73	35.73	586		2468	5
10	Noemie Desailly	France	F	34.73	33.51	34.73	566		2615	1
11	Suzanne Fournier	France	27.45	30.13	33.37	33.37	541		1899	18
12	Jordyn Bruce	United States	F	F	32.93	32.93	532		2177	10
13	Robin Selkirk	Canada	31.38	27.72	32.84	32.84	531		2010	13
14	Corinn Brewer	United States	32.34	30.13	31.99	32.34	521		1860	21
15	Elisabeth Eichinger	United States	26.24	30.70	32.09	32.09	516		1936	17
16	Roseva Bidois	France	29.19	31.19	F	31.19	499		2595	3
17	Adeline Audigier	France	27.50	29.39	29.18	29.39	465		2001	15
18	Madison Luthy	United States	26.63	F	26.17	26.63	413		1853	22
19	Raphäele Rolnin	France	26.33	22.99	23.56	26.33	407		1884	20
20	Amber Nyssen	Australia	26.17	23.65	F	26.17	404		1779	24
21	Giselle Burgos	Mexico	23.43	25.48	25.34	25.48	391		1779	24
22	Uxia Pereira Alonso	Spain	23.49	22.11	23.46	23.49	354		2004	14
23	Suraia Amer	Palestine	19.47	22.77	22.22	22.77	341		1837	23
24	Maria Sartin	New Zealand	16.05	20.11	20.70	20.70	302		1958	16
--	Laura Mathews	United States	--	--	--	--	0		2247	8
--	Katie Straus	United States				--	0		830	26

=== 1500 metres ===
The 1500 metres was the last event, taking place in one heat on 9 August.

Rank	Athlete	Nation	Time	Points	Notes	Overall points	Overall rank
1	Corinn Brewer	United States	4:50.76	889	WDB	6504	12
2	Delaney Straus	United States	4:53.14	872		6495	13
3	Giselle Burgos	Mexico	5:07.10	780		5639	21
4	Esther Conde-Turpin	France	5:07.89	775		7704	4
5	Nikki Boon	Netherlands	5:08.74	770		7714	3
6	Maria Sartin	New Zealand	5:10.04	761		5855	18
7	Amber Nyssen	Australia	5:15.74	725		5513	22
8	Jordyn Bruce	United States	5:16.88	718		7079	7
9	Noemie Desailly	France	5:18.30	710		7805	2
10	Adeline Audigier	France	5:22.12	686		6547	11
11	Julia Jongejeugd	Netherlands	5:26.49	660		6802	9
12	Jessica Swalve	United States	5:27.12	656		6739	10
13	Suzanne Fournier	France	5:28.95	645		6251	15
14	Roseva Bidois	France	5:29.61	641		7698	5
15	Madison Luthy	United States	5:32.17	626		5956	17
16	Robin Selkirk	Canada	5:36.35	602		6185	16
17	Hannah Hill	United States	5:38.80	589		6888	8
18	Uxia Pereira Alonso	Spain	5:41.90	571		5846	19
19	Camryn Newton-Smith	Australia	5:48.49	535		7900	1
20	Suraia Amer	Palestine	5:51.44	519		4730	23
21	Alysa Henry	United States	5:52.69	513		7573	6
22	Elisabeth Eichinger	United States	5:55.75	496		5645	20
23	Aubrey Phillips	United States	6:18.90	383		6398	14
--	Raphäele Rolnin	France	--	0		4636	24
--	Laura Mathews	United States	--	0		3293	25
--	Katie Straus	United States	--	0		830	26

== Overall results ==
Key

The highest mark recorded in each event is highlighted in yellow.

Key:	CR	Championship record	AR	Area record	NR	National record	PB	Personal best	SB	Seasonal best	DNS	Did not start	DNF	Did not finish	NM	No Mark

Rank	Athlete	Nation	Overall points	100 m	LJ	SP	HJ	400 m	100 m H	DT	PV	JT	1500 m
1st place, gold medalist(s)	Camryn Newton-Smith	Australia	7900	985; 11.83	902; 6.17	718; 12.86	916; 1.75	893; 55.41	1034; 13.61	543; 34.22	761; 3.50	613; 37.15	535; 5:48.49
2nd place, silver medalist(s)	Noemie Desailly	France	7805	950; 12.01	877; 6.09	788; 13.91	701; 1.57	885; 55.59	960; 14.13	647; 39.65	721; 3.40	566; 34.73	710; 5:18.30
3rd place, bronze medalist(s)	Nikki Boon	Netherlands	7714	943; 12.05	780; 5.77	745; 13.27	701; 1.57	852; 56.35	931; 14.34	645; 39.54	761; 3.50	586; 35.73	770; 5:08.74
4	Esther Conde-Turpin	France	7704	991; 11.80	837; 5.96	755; 13.42	842; 1.69	864; 56.07	1066; 13.39	522; 33.15	315; 2.30	737; 43.64	775; 5:07.89
5	Roseva Bidois	France	7698	939; 12.07	859; 6.03	797; 14.04	736; 1.60	865; 56.04	905; 14.53	736; 44.19	721; 3.40	499; 31.19	641; 5:29.61
6	Alysa Henry	United States	7573	914; 12.20	783; 5.78	659; 11.97	916; 1.75	715; 59.60	907; 14.51	500; 31.98	930; 3.90	736; 43.59	513; 5:52.69
7	Jordyn Bruce	United States	7079	860; 12.49	706; 5.52	611; 11.85	736; 1.60	690; 1:00.24	945; 14.24	601; 37.25	680; 3.30	532; 32.93	718; 5:16.88
8	Hannah Hill	United States	6888	973; 11.89	880; 6.10	605; 11.15	666; 1.54	920; 54.82	932; 14.33	538; 33.96	136; 1.70	649; 39.02	589; 5:38.80
9	Julia Jongejeugd	Netherlands	6802	840; 12.60	756; 5.69	639; 11.66	701; 1.57	698; 1:00.03	946; 14.23	592; 36.81	382; 2.50	588; 35.88	660; 5:26.49
10	Jessica Swalve	United States	6739	833; 12.64	643; 5.30	678; 12.25	632; 1.51	772; 58.23	884; 14.68	517; 32.90	488; 2.80	636; 38.37	656; 5:27.12
11	Adeline Audigier	France	6547	750; 13.11	697; 5.49	554; 10.37	842; 1.69	691; 1:00.20	863; 14.84	511; 32.54	488; 2.80	465; 29.39	686; 5:22.12
12	Corinn Brewer	United States	6504	731; 13.22	592; 5.12	537; 10.12	666; 1.54	739; 59.02	753; 15.69	474; 30.61	602; 3.10	521; 32.34	889; 4:50.76
13	Delaney Straus	United States	6495	790; 12.88	683; 5.44	425; 8.40	701; 1.57	729; 59.26	777; 15.50	464; 30.08	382; 2.50	672; 40.23	872; 4:53.14
14	Aubrey Phillips	United States	6398	824; 12.69	612; 5.19	692; 12.46	806; 1.66	685; 1:00.35	832; 15.07	417; 27.60	526; 2.90	621; 37.59	383; 6:18.90
15	Suzanne Fournier	France	6251	778; 12.95	581; 5.08	540; 10.16	599; 1.48	671; 1:00.71	666; 16.40	509; 32.46	721; 3.40	541; 33.37	645; 5:28.95
16	Robin Selkirk	Canada	6185	826; 12.68	620; 5.22	564; 10.53	736; 1.60	633; 1:01.70	878; 14.73	378; 25.50	417; 2.60	531; 32.84	602; 5:36.35
17	Madison Luthy	United States	5956	676; 13.55	637; 5.28	540; 10.16	701; 1.57	612; 1:02.25	770; 15.55	418; 27.64	563; 3.00	413; 26.63	626; 5:32.17
18	Maria Sartin	New Zealand	5855	840; 12.60	671; 5.40	447; 8.74	534; 1.42	831; 56.84	756; 15.66	365; 24.77	348; 2.40	302; 20.70	761; 5:10.04
19	Uxia Pereira Alonso	Spain	5846	890; 12.33	584; 5.09	530; 10.01	666; 1.54	691; 1:00.21	991; 13.91	221; 16.83	348; 2.40	354; 23.49	571; 5:41.90
20	Elisabeth Eichinger	United States	5645	789; 12.89	584; 5.09	563; 10.51	534; 1.42	650; 1:01.24	774; 15.52	391; 26.17	348; 2.40	516; 32.09	496; 5:55.75
21	Giselle Burgos	Mexico	5639	731; 13.22	490; 4.74	558; 10.44	470; 1.36	662; 1:00.95	806; 15.27	369; 24.98	382; 2.50	391; 25.48	780; 5:07.10
22	Amber Nyssen	Australia	5513	735; 13.20	576; 5.06	468; 9.06	599; 1.48	679; 1:00.52	668; 16.38	277; 19.97	382; 2.50	404; 26.17	725; 5:15.74
23	Suraia Amer	Palestine	4730	833; 12.64	581; 5.08	423; 8.37	439; 1.33	687; 1:00.32	242; 20.76	248; 18.31	417; 2.60	341; 22.77	519; 5:51.44
24	Raphäele Rolnin	France	4636	706; 13.37	620; 5.22	558; 10.43	666; 1.54	512; 1:05.02	651; 16.53	516; 32.82	0 --	407; 26.33	0 --
	Laura Mathews	United States	3293	968; 11.92	640; 5.29	639; 11.66	599; 1.48	447; 1:06.94	0 --	0 --	0 --	0 --	0 --
	Katie Straus	United States		830; 12.66	0; 3.63	0 --	0 --	0 --	0 --	0 --	0 --	0 --	0 --
