= 2025 Women's Decathlon World Championships =

- Venue: SPIRE Institute, Geneva, Ohio
- Dates: 16 August 2025; 17 August 2025
- Competitors: 19 from 5 nations
- Winning points: 7451

Medalists
gold medal	Nikki Boon	Netherlands
silver medal	Katie Straus	United States
bronze medal	Jordyn Bruce	United States

The second edition of the Women's Decathlon World Championships was held in Geneva, Ohio, on 16 and 17 August 2025. Nikki Boon of the Netherlands won the gold medal, with Americans Katie Straus and Jordyn Bruce winning the silver and bronze medals.

== Background ==
The event was the second global women's decathlon championship. It was organized by Lauren Kuntz. Part of the objective of the event was to extend the women's decathlon movement internationally.

As the 2024 runner-up, Roseva Bidois was considered the frontrunner. Boon finished runner-up in the long jump, shot put, 400 m, and discus throw in order to win the gold medal. The event was broadcast on the All Women's Sports Network on PlutoTV.

== Schedule ==
The women's decathlon took place over two consecutive days, with five events each day.

Date	Event
16 August 2025	100 metres Long jump Shot put High jump 400 metres
17 August 2025	100 metres hurdles Discus throw Pole vault Javelin throw 1500 metres

== Records ==
Prior to this competition, the existing world, championship, and area records were as follows.

World record	Austra Skujytė (LTU)	8358	Columbia, Missouri, United States	14-15 April 2005
Championship record	Allison Halverson (ARM)	7236	Geneva, Ohio, United States	3-4 August 2024
World leading	Roséva Bidois (FRA)	7107	Thonon-les-Bains, France	26-27 July 2025

Area	Points	Athlete	Nation
Africa (records)	7014	Margaret Simpson	Ghana
Asia (records)	7798	Irina Naumenko	Kazakhstan
Europe (records)	8358 WR	Austra Skujytė	Lithuania
North, Central America and Caribbean (records)	8246	Jordan Gray	United States
Oceania (records)	5927	Meagan Rentsch	Australia
South America (records)	6570	Andrea Bordalejo	Argentina

== Results ==
=== 100 metres ===
The 100 metres was started on 16 August 2025.

Wind readings: Heat 1: (+0.5 m/s); Heat 2: (+0.5 m/s); Heat 3: (+1.0 m/s).

Rank	Heat	Name	Nationality	Time	Points	Notes
1	1	Laura Mathews	United States	12.00	952	
2	3	Faith Ladin	United States	12.16	922	
3	1	Kendra Leger	Canada	12.19	916	
4	1	Nikki Boon	Netherlands	12.23	909	
5	2	Katie Straus	United States	12.24	907	
6	1	Roséva Bidois	France	12.27	901	
7	2	Halle Walcutt	United States	12.42	873	
8	3	Delaney Straus	United States	12.43	871	
9	3	Miranda Marr	United States	12.45	868	
10	1	Jordyn Bruce	United States	12.51	857	
11	3	Raphaëlle Rolnin	France	12.55	850	
12	3	Madison Luthy	United States	12.57	846	
13	1	Anaïk Previdi	France	12.66	830	
14	3	Suzanne Fournier	France	12.67	828	
15	1	Emily Swanson	United States	12.91	785	
16	2	Giselle Burgos	Mexico	12.93	782	
17	2	Orianne Meunier	France	12.98	773	
18	2	Corinn Brewer	United States	13.08	755	
19	2	Adeline Audigier	France	13.21	733	

=== Long jump ===
The long jump was started on 16 August 2025.

Rank	Group	Athlete	Nation	#1	#2	#3	Distance	Points	Notes	Overall points	Overall rank
1	1	Kendra Leger	Canada	5.61	5.93	(-2.0)	5.93 (+0.0 m/s)	828		1744	1
2	1	Nikki Boon	Netherlands	5.91 (+0.7 m/s)	(-0.7)	5.80 (−3.3 m/s)	5.91 (+0.7 m/s)	822		1731	2
3	1	Jordyn Bruce	United States	(-0.2)	5.62 (−1.4 m/s)	5.79	5.79 (+0.0 m/s)	786		1643	6
4	1	Katie Straus	United States	5.52 (+0.1 m/s)	5.65 (+0.7 m/s)	5.39 (−1.3 m/s)	5.65 (+0.7 m/s)	744		1651	5
5	1	Roséva Bidois	France	5.64 (−1.0 m/s)	3.38	5.55 (−0.6 m/s)	5.64 (−1.0 m/s)	741		1642	7
6	2	Faith Ladin	United States	5.40 (−0.1 m/s)	5.63 (−0.3 m/s)	5.49 (−1.2 m/s)	5.63 (−0.3 m/s)	738		1660	4
7	1	Laura Mathews	United States		5.56 (−1.2 m/s)	5.05 (+1.0 m/s)	5.56 (−1.2 m/s)	717		1669	3
8	1	Anaïk Previdi	France	5.37	5.35	5.40 (−0.8 m/s)	5.40 (−0.8 m/s)	671		1501	10
9	2	Delaney Straus	United States	5.11	4.66 (+0.4 m/s)	5.36	5.36 (+0.0 m/s)	660		1531	8
10	2	Miranda Marr	United States		5.28 (+0.1 m/s)	5.06	5.28 (+0.1 m/s)	637		1505	9
10	1	Emily Swanson	United States	5.25	5.25	5.28 (−0.8 m/s)	5.28 (−0.8 m/s)	637		1422	14
12	2	Orianne Meunier	France	4.97	5.18	5.26	5.26 (+0.0 m/s)	631		1404	15
13	2	Raphaëlle Rolnin	France	5.25	5.24		5.25 (+0.0 m/s)	628		1478	12
14	1	Adeline Audigier	France	(+0.6)	5.24 (−1.1 m/s)	5.11 (−1.1 m/s)	5.24 (−1.1 m/s)	626		1359	17
15	2	Madison Luthy	United States	5.19 (+0.6 m/s)	5.22	5.19	5.22 (+0.0 m/s)	620		1466	13
16	1	Halle Walcutt	United States	5.20	5.17 (−0.4 m/s)	(+0.5)	5.20 (+0.0 m/s)	614		1487	11
17	2	Corinn Brewer	United States	5.00 (+0.2 m/s)	5.14 (+0.2 m/s)	5.15	5.15 (+0.0 m/s)	601		1356	18
18	2	Suzanne Fournier	France	5.00	-- (+0.7 m/s)	4.92 (+0.3 m/s)	5.00 (+0.0 m/s)	559		1387	16
19	2	Giselle Burgos	Mexico	4.56	4.58 (+0.7 m/s)	4.84	4.84 (+0.0 m/s)	516		1298	19

=== Shot put ===
The shot put was started in one group on 16 August 2025.

Rank	Athlete	Nation	#1	#2	#3	Distance	Points	Notes	Overall points	Overall rank
1	Roséva Bidois	France	12.49	12.84	13.07	13.07	732		2374	2
2	Nikki Boon	Netherlands	12.45	12.64	12.72	12.72	709		2440	1
3	Katie Straus	United States	11.21	11.58	F	11.58	633		2284	4
4	Emily Swanson	United States	11.36	F	10.98	11.36	619		2041	10
5	Miranda Marr	United States	11.05	10.01	F	11.05	598		2103	8
6	Jordyn Bruce	United States	F	10.51	10.98	10.98	594		2237	5
7	Faith Ladin	United States	10.21	10.63	F	10.63	571		2231	6
8	Giselle Burgos	Mexico	9.90	10.12	10.51	10.51	563		1861	19
9	Corinn Brewer	United States	9.49	9.72	10.40	10.40	556		1912	16
10	Raphaëlle Rolnin	France	10.28	9.72	10.13	10.28	548		2026	12
11	Halle Walcutt	United States	9.74	10.05	10.22	10.22	544		2031	11
12	Kendra Leger	Canada	9.79	9.99	10.21	10.21	543		2287	3
13	Delaney Straus	United States	8.68	9.01	10.11	10.11	537		2068	9
14	Orianne Meunier	France	10.07	9.53	9.64	10.07	534		1938	15
15	Adeline Audigier	France	10.06	10.00	9.28	10.06	533		1892	17
16	Laura Mathews	United States	9.77	10.05	9.96	10.05	533		2202	7
17	Madison Luthy	United States	9.39	9.72	10.01	10.01	530		1996	13
18	Anaïk Previdi	France	9.27	9.47	8.79	9.47	495		1996	13
19	Suzanne Fournier	France	9.31	9.12	9.39	9.39	490		1877	18

=== High jump ===
The high jump was started on 16 August 2025.

Rank	Group	Name	Nation	1.30	1.33	1.36	1.39	1.42	1.45	1.48	1.51	1.54	1.57	1.60	1.63	1.66	1.69	1.72	1.75	Result	Points	Notes	Overall points	Overall rank
1	1	Katie Straus	United States	PPP	PPP	PPP	PPP	P	PPP	PPP	PPP	O	O	O	XXO	O	XO	XO	–	1.72	879		3163	1
2	1	Laura Mathews	United States	PPP	PPP	PPP	PPP	PPP	PPP	O	O	XO	XO	O	O	XO	XXO	XXX	–	1.69	842		3044	4
3	2	Miranda Marr	United States	PPP	PPP	PPP	PPP	PPP	PPP	O	O	PPP	O	O	O	XXX	–	–	–	1.63	771		2874	8
3	1	Emily Swanson	United States	PPP	PPP	PPP	PPP	PPP	PPP	PPP	PPP	XXO	XO	XXO	XO	XXX	–	–	–	1.63	771		2812	9
5	2	Madison Luthy	United States	PPP	PPP	PPP	PPP	PPP	O	P	O	O	O	XO	XXX	–	–	–	–	1.60	736		2732	10
5	1	Adeline Audigier	France	PPP	PPP	PPP	PPP	P	PPP	PPP	O	O	O	XO	XXX	–	–	–	–	1.60	736		2628	14
7	1	Roséva Bidois	France	PPP	PPP	PPP	PPP	PPP	PPP	PPP	O	XO	O	XXX	–	–	–	–	–	1.57	701		3075	3
7	1	Jordyn Bruce	United States	PPP	PPP	PPP	PPP	PPP	PPP	O	O	O	XO	XXX	–	–	–	–	–	1.57	701		2938	5
7	1	Anaïk Previdi	France	PPP	PPP	PPP	PPP	XO	PPP	O	PPP	O	O	XXX	–	–	–	–	–	1.57	701		2697	12
7	1	Faith Ladin	United States	PPP	PPP	PPP	PPP	XO	O	PPP	O	XO	XO	XXX	–	–	–	–	–	1.57	701		2932	6
7	1	Nikki Boon	Netherlands	PPP	PPP	PPP	PPP	P	PPP	O	O	O	O	XXX	–	–	–	–	–	1.57	701		3141	2
12	2	Raphaëlle Rolnin	France	PPP	PPP	PPP	O	PPP	O	O	O	XO	XXX	–	–	–	–	–	–	1.54	666		2692	13
12	2	Corinn Brewer	United States	PPP	PPP	PPP	PPP	O	O	O	XO	XO	XXX	–	–	–	–	–	–	1.54	666		2578	16
14	2	Suzanne Fournier	France	PPP	PPP	O	O	O	O	O	O	XXX	–	–	–	–	–	–	–	1.51	632		2509	17
14	2	Delaney Straus	United States	PPP	PPP	O	O	O	O	–	XXO	XXX	–	–	–	–	–	–	–	1.51	632		2700	11
14	1	Kendra Leger	Canada	PPP	PPP	PPP	PPP	O	XO	O	O	XXX	–	–	–	–	–	–	–	1.51	632		2919	7
17	2	Giselle Burgos	Mexico	O	XXO	O	O	O	XO	O	XXX	–	–	–	–	–	–	–	–	1.48	599		2460	19
18	2	Halle Walcutt	United States	PPP	PPP	O	PPP	O	O	–	XXX	–	–	–	–	–	–	–	–	1.45	566		2597	15
19	2	Orianne Meunier	France	PPP	PPP	O	O	XO	XXX	–	–	–	–	–	–	–	–	–	–	1.42	534		2472	18

=== 400 metres ===
The 400 metres was started on 16 August 2025.

Rank	Heat	Name	Nationality	Time	Points	Notes	Overall points	Overall rank
1	1	Kendra Leger	Canada	57.05	822		3741	5
2	2	Nikki Boon	Netherlands	57.06	821		3962	2
3	1	Katie Straus	United States	57.47	804		3967	1
4	1	Laura Mathews	United States	58.04	780		3824	4
5	1	Roséva Bidois	France	58.29	769		3844	3
6	1	Jordyn Bruce	United States	58.58	757		3695	6
7	2	Corinn Brewer	United States	58.87	745		3323	14
8	1	Halle Walcutt	United States	59.06	737		3334	12
9	2	Giselle Burgos	Mexico	59.87	704		3164	17
10	3	Miranda Marr	United States	1:00.50	679		3553	8
11	2	Emily Swanson	United States	1:00.66	673		3485	9
12	1	Delaney Straus	United States	1:00.67	673		3373	10
12	2	Adeline Audigier	France	1:00.67	673		3301	15
14	3	Faith Ladin	United States	1:01.06	657		3589	7
15	3	Anaïk Previdi	France	1:01.07	657		3354	12
16	2	Madison Luthy	United States	1:01.89	626		3358	11
17	3	Orianne Meunier	France	1:02.90	588		3060	19
18	3	Suzanne Fournier	France	1:03.27	574		3083	18
19	3	Raphaëlle Rolnin	France	1:05.37	500		3192	16

=== 100 metres hurdles ===
The 100 metres hurdles began on 17 August 2025.

Wind readings: Heat 1: (±0.0 m/s); Heat 2: (+0.6 m/s); Heat 3: (+2.6 m/s).

Rank	Heat	Athlete	Nation	Time	Points	Notes	Overall points	Overall rank
1	1	Kendra Leger	Canada	13.61	1034		4775	3
2	1	Jordyn Bruce	United States	14.06	970		4665	6
3	1	Katie Straus	United States	14.23	946		4913	1
4	1	Laura Mathews	United States	14.28	939		4763	4
5	1	Nikki Boon	Netherlands	14.81	867		4829	2
6	1	Emily Swanson	United States	14.93	851		4336	8
7	2	Roséva Bidois	France	15.02	839		4683	5
8	3	Raphaëlle Rolnin	France	15.35	796		3988	15
9	2	Giselle Burgos	Mexico	15.39	791		3955	16
10	3	Anaïk Previdi	France	15.41	788		4142	11
11	2	Madison Luthy	United States	15.43	786		4144	10
12	3	Orianne Meunier	France	15.53	773		3833	17
13	3	Delaney Straus	United States	15.57	768		4141	12
14	2	Adeline Audigier	France	15.63	760		4061	13
15	1	Miranda Marr	United States	15.66	756		4309	9
16	2	Faith Ladin	United States	15.70	751		4340	7
17	3	Corinn Brewer	United States	15.86	732		4055	14
18	3	Suzanne Fournier	France	16.80	619		3702	18
--	2	Halle Walcutt	United States	--	0		3334	19

=== Discus throw ===
The discus throw took place in one group on 17 August 2025.

Rank	Athlete	Nation	#1	#2	#3	Distance	Points	Notes	Overall points	Overall rank
1	Roséva Bidois	France	39.82	43.69	43.44	43.69	726		5409	2
2	Nikki Boon	Netherlands	35.22	41.11	F	41.11	676		5505	1
3	Raphaëlle Rolnin	France	F	F	39.63	39.63	647		4635	10
4	Corinn Brewer	United States	26.46	32.00	33.39	33.39	527		4582	12
5	Halle Walcutt	United States	F	32.56	F	32.56	511		3845	19
6	Jordyn Bruce	United States	31.50	F	F	31.50	491		5156	5
7	Faith Ladin	United States	27.30	30.26	31.38	31.38	489		4829	7
8	Adeline Audigier	France	30.09	F	31.03	31.03	482		4543	13
9	Laura Mathews	United States	30.53	27.85	F	30.53	472		5235	4
10	Delaney Straus	United States	F	30.33	F	30.33	469		4610	11
11	Emily Swanson	United States	F	28.07	29.99	29.99	462		4798	8
12	Suzanne Fournier	France	22.98	F	29.88	29.88	460		4162	18
13	Orianne Meunier	France	27.10	F	28.03	28.03	425		4258	17
14	Katie Straus	United States	22.12	F	27.24	27.24	411		5324	3
15	Madison Luthy	United States	26.01	F	F	26.01	388		4532	14
16	Anaïk Previdi	France	F	F	24.15	24.15	353		4495	15
17	Miranda Marr	United States	23.30	23.07	F	23.30	338		4647	9
18	Kendra Leger	Canada	21.24	22.15	F	22.15	317		5092	6
19	Giselle Burgos	Mexico	21.88	21.16	21.24	21.88	312		4267	16

=== Pole vault ===
The pole vault took place on 17 August 2025.

Rank	Group	Athlete	Nation	1.80	1.90	2.00	2.10	2.20	2.30	2.40	2.50	2.60	2.70	2.80	2.90	3.00	3.10	3.20	3.30	3.40	3.50	3.60	3.70	Height	Points	Notes	Overall points	Overall rank
1	2	Madison Luthy	United States	–	–	–	–	–	–	–	–	–	–	–	–	O	O	O	XO	O	XO	XXO	XXX	3.60	803		5335	9
1	1	Corinn Brewer	United States	PPP	PPP	PPP	PPP	PPP	PPP	PPP	PPP	PPP	PPP	PPP	PPP	PPP	PPP	PPP	XO	PPP	XXO	O	XXX	3.60	803		5385	8
3	1	Roséva Bidois	France	PPP	O	PPP	PPP	PPP	PPP	PPP	PPP	PPP	PPP	PPP	PPP	PPP	XXO	O	XXO	O	XO	XXX	–	3.50	761		6170	1
3	1	Katie Straus	United States	PPP	O	PPP	PPP	PPP	PPP	PPP	PPP	PPP	PPP	O	O	XO	O	XXO	XO	O	XO	XXX	–	3.50	761		6085	2
5	1	Jordyn Bruce	United States	PPP	O	PPP	PPP	PPP	PPP	PPP	PPP	PPP	PPP	XO	O	O	O	O	O	XXO	XXX	–	–	3.40	721		5877	4
6	2	Anaïk Previdi	France	–	–	–	–	–	–	–	–	–	–	O	PPP	O	PPP	O	XXX	–	–	–	–	3.20	641		5136	11
7	2	Suzanne Fournier	France	–	–	–	–	–	–	–	–	–	–	O	O	O	O	XXX	–	–	–	–	–	3.10	602		4764	15
7	1	Emily Swanson	United States	PPP	PPP	PPP	PPP	PPP	PPP	PPP	PPP	PPP	PPP	O	PPP	O	O	XXX	–	–	–	–	–	3.10	602		5400	7
9	1	Nikki Boon	Netherlands	PPP	O	PPP	PPP	PPP	O	PPP	O	PPP	O	PPP	XO	XO	XXX	–	–	–	–	–	–	3.00	563		6068	3
10	2	Adeline Audigier	France	–	–	–	–	–	–	–	O	PPP	O	PPP	XXX	–	–	–	–	–	–	–	–	2.70	452		4995	13
11	1	Miranda Marr	United States	O	XXO	O	PPP	O	O	O	O	O	XXX	–	–	–	–	–	–	–	–	–	–	2.60	417		5064	12
11	1	Laura Mathews	United States	O	PPP	PPP	PPP	PPP	O	XO	O	O	XXX	–	–	–	–	–	–	–	–	–	–	2.60	417		5652	5
13	2	Giselle Burgos	Mexico	–	O	O	O	O	O	XXO	XXO	XXX	–	–	–	–	–	–	–	–	–	–	–	2.50	382		4649	16
14	2	Orianne Meunier	France	–	O	O	O	O	O	XXO	XXX	–	–	O	O	O	O	–	–	–	–	–	–	2.40	348		4606	18
15	1	Faith Ladin	United States	O	O	PPP	O	O	O	XXX	–	–	–	–	–	–	–	–	–	–	–	–	–	2.30	315		5144	10
15	1	Kendra Leger	Canada	XO	O	O	O	O	XO	XXX	–	–	–	–	–	–	–	–	–	–	–	–	–	2.30	315		5407	6
17	2	Delaney Straus	United States	–	–	–	XXO	O	XXX	–	–	–	–	–	–	–	–	–	–	–	–	–	–	2.20	282		4892	14
18	2	Halle Walcutt	United States	XO	XXO	O	XO	XXX	–	–	–	–	–	–	–	–	–	–	–	–	–	–	–	2.10	251		4096	19
--	1	Raphaëlle Rolnin	France	PPP	PPP	PPP	PPP	PPP	PPP	PPP	PPP	PPP	PPP	XXX	–	–	–	–	–	–	–	–	–	--	0		4635	17

=== Javelin throw ===
The javelin throw took place in one flight on 17 August 2025.

Rank	Athlete	Nation	#1	#2	#3	Distance	Points	Notes	Overall points	Overall rank
1	Faith Ladin	United States	42.04	40.10	36.22	42.04	706		5850	9
2	Jordyn Bruce	United States	41.69	39.93	40.82	41.69	700		6577	4
3	Nikki Boon	Netherlands	38.41	37.92	40.14	40.14	670		6738	1
4	Delaney Straus	United States	39.83	F	33.00	39.83	664		5556	13
5	Miranda Marr	United States	28.30	36.55	35.41	36.55	601		5665	11
6	Corinn Brewer	United States	29.11	35.80	30.86	35.80	587		5972	7
7	Emily Swanson	United States	29.51	F	35.40	35.40	579		5979	6
8	Roséva Bidois	France	32.59	27.18	F	32.59	526		6696	2
9	Katie Straus	United States	29.28	32.21	F	32.21	519		6604	3
10	Halle Walcutt	United States	F	32.07	P	32.07	516		4612	19
11	Kendra Leger	Canada	27.79	24.66	31.70	31.70	509		5916	8
12	Orianne Meunier	France	30.16	29.49	31.01	31.01	496		5102	16
13	Laura Mathews	United States	24.98	30.88	24.05	30.88	493		6145	5
14	Anaïk Previdi	France	28.58	29.27	26.85	29.27	463		5599	12
15	Raphaëlle Rolnin	France	28.66	26.50	28.86	28.86	455		5090	17
16	Adeline Audigier	France	27.43	28.58	28.10	28.58	450		5445	14
17	Giselle Burgos	Mexico	27.70	25.73	F	27.70	433		5082	18
18	Suzanne Fournier	France	25.00	27.51	25.97	27.51	430		5194	15
19	Madison Luthy	United States	22.01	25.75	25.68	25.75	396		5731	10

=== 1500 metres ===
The 1500 metres was the last event, taking place in one heat on 17 August 2025.

Rank	Athlete	Nation	Time	Points	Notes	Overall points	Overall rank
1	Corinn Brewer	United States	4:52.27	878		6850	5
2	Delaney Straus	United States	5:01.62	816		6372	10
3	Giselle Burgos	Mexico	5:05.79	789		5871	15
4	Nikki Boon	Netherlands	5:17.70	713		7451	1
5	Katie Straus	United States	5:20.36	697		7301	2
6	Jordyn Bruce	United States	5:20.66	695		7272	3
7	Madison Luthy	United States	5:25.43	666		6397	9
8	Kendra Leger	Canada	5:33.84	617		6533	8
9	Suzanne Fournier	France	5:33.98	616		5810	16
10	Emily Swanson	United States	5:36.55	601		6580	7
11	Anaïk Previdi	France	5:38.85	588		6187	13
12	Miranda Marr	United States	5:41.55	573		6238	12
13	Orianne Meunier	France	5:44.87	555		5657	17
14	Adeline Audigier	France	5:48.84	533		5978	14
15	Roséva Bidois	France	5:49.29	531		7227	4
16	Laura Mathews	United States	5:50.53	524		6669	6
17	Raphaëlle Rolnin	France	5:58.03	485		5575	18
18	Faith Ladin	United States	5:59.34	478		6328	11
--	Halle Walcutt	United States	--	0		4612	19

== Overall results ==
Key

The highest mark recorded in each event is highlighted in yellow.

Key:	CR	Championship record	AR	Area record	NR	National record	PB	Personal best	SB	Seasonal best	DNS	Did not start	DNF	Did not finish	NM	No Mark

Rank	Athlete	Nation	Overall points	100 m	LJ	SP	HJ	400 m	100 m H	DT	PV	JT	1500 m
1st place, gold medalist(s)	Nikki Boon	Netherlands	7451	909; 12.23	822; 5.91	709; 12.72	701; 1.57	821; 57.06	867; 14.81	676; 41.11	563; 3.00	670; 40.14	713; 5:17.70
2nd place, silver medalist(s)	Katie Straus	United States	7301	907; 12.24	744; 5.65	633; 11.58	879; 1.72	804; 57.47	946; 14.23	411; 27.24	761; 3.50	519; 32.21	697; 5:20.36
3rd place, bronze medalist(s)	Jordyn Bruce	United States	7272	857; 12.51	786; 5.79	594; 10.98	701; 1.57	757; 58.58	970; 14.06	491; 31.50	721; 3.40	700; 41.69	695; 5:20.66
4	Roséva Bidois	France	7227	901; 12.27	741; 5.64	732; 13.07	701; 1.57	769; 58.29	839; 15.02	726; 43.69	761; 3.50	526; 32.59	531; 5:49.29
5	Corinn Brewer	United States	6850	755; 13.08	601; 5.15	556; 10.40	666; 1.54	745; 58.87	732; 15.86	527; 33.39	803; 3.60	587; 35.80	878; 4:52.27
6	Laura Mathews	United States	6669	952; 12.00	717; 5.56	533; 10.05	842; 1.69	780; 58.04	939; 14.28	472; 30.53	417; 2.60	493; 30.88	524; 5:50.53
7	Emily Swanson	United States	6580	785; 12.91	637; 5.28	619; 11.36	771; 1.63	673; 1:00.66	851; 14.93	462; 29.99	602; 3.10	579; 35.40	601; 5:36.55
8	Kendra Leger	Canada	6533	916; 12.19	828; 5.93	543; 10.21	632; 1.51	822; 57.05	1034; 13.61	317; 22.15	315; 2.30	509; 31.70	617; 5:33.84
9	Madison Luthy	United States	6397	846; 12.57	620; 5.22	530; 10.01	736; 1.60	626; 1:01.89	786; 15.43	388; 26.01	803; 3.60	396; 25.75	666; 5:25.43
10	Delaney Straus	United States	6372	871; 12.43	660; 5.36	537; 10.11	632; 1.51	673; 1:00.67	768; 15.57	469; 30.33	282; 2.20	664; 39.83	816; 5:01.62
11	Faith Ladin	United States	6328	922; 12.16	738; 5.63	571; 10.63	701; 1.57	657; 1:01.06	751; 15.70	489; 31.38	315; 2.30	706; 42.04	478; 5:59.34
12	Miranda Marr	United States	6238	868; 12.45	637; 5.28	598; 11.05	771; 1.63	679; 1:00.50	756; 15.66	338; 23.30	417; 2.60	601; 36.55	573; 5:41.55
13	Anaïk Previdi	France	6187	830; 12.66	671; 5.40	495; 9.47	701; 1.57	657; 1:01.07	788; 15.41	353; 24.15	641; 3.20	463; 29.27	588; 5:38.85
14	Adeline Audigier	France	5978	733; 13.21	626; 5.24	533; 10.06	736; 1.60	673; 1:00.67	760; 15.63	482; 31.03	452; 2.70	450; 28.58	533; 5:48.84
15	Giselle Burgos	Mexico	5871	782; 12.93	516; 4.84	563; 10.51	599; 1.48	704; 59.87	791; 15.39	312; 21.88	382; 2.50	433; 27.70	789; 5:05.79
16	Suzanne Fournier	France	5810	828; 12.67	559; 5.00	490; 9.39	632; 1.51	574; 1:03.27	619; 16.80	460; 29.88	602; 3.10	430; 27.51	616; 5:33.98
17	Orianne Meunier	France	5657	773; 12.98	631; 5.26	534; 10.07	534; 1.42	588; 1:02.90	773; 15.53	425; 28.03	348; 2.40	496; 31.01	555; 5:44.87
18	Raphaëlle Rolnin	France	5575	850; 12.55	628; 5.25	548; 10.28	666; 1.54	500; 1:05.37	796; 15.35	647; 39.63	0 --	455; 28.86	485; 5:58.03
	Halle Walcutt	United States	4612	873; 12.42	614; 5.20	544; 10.22	566; 1.45	737; 59.06	0 --	511; 32.56	251; 2.10	516; 32.07	0 --
