= Jordyn Bruce =

American heptathlete (born 1998)

Personal information
- Born: 14 August 1998 (age 27)

Sport
- Country: United States
- Sport: Athletics
- Event(s): Heptathlon; Decathlon
Medal record
Women's athletics
Representing the United States
Decathlon World Championships
Bronze medal – third place	2024 Geneva	Decathlon
Bronze medal – third place	2025 Geneva	Decathlon

Jordyn Bruce (born 14 August 1998) is an American heptathlete and decathlete. She set an unofficial American record in the indoor heptathlon and won bronze medals at the inaugural and second Women's Decathlon World Championships.

== Career ==
=== Early career ===
Bruce is from Eagle River, Anchorage, Alaska. She was a swimmer for most of her life, and only tried track and field events for the first time at Eagle River High School. She started running the 800 meters but then transitioned to hurdles, setting top prep marks in the 100 metres hurdles and 300 metres hurdles.

Bruce competed for the Illinois State Redbirds track and field team beginning in 2017. She initially focused on the 400 meters hurdles, placing 6th at the 2017 USATF U20 Outdoor Championships in that event.

She would set a school record in the indoor athletics pentathlon indoors. Bruce won Missouri Valley Conference championships but did not qualify for the NCAA Division I Indoor or Outdoor Track and Field Championships until 2021, when she placed 7th in the 400 m hurdles at the West regional and did not advance.

=== Decathlon ===
Bruce finished 6th in the 400 m hurdles at the 2022 Texas Relays. She qualified in the pentathlon for the 2023 USA Indoor Track and Field Championships, where she finished 12th. Following graduation in 2023, she began training for the women's decathlon; she learned how to pole vault in the summer of 2023 at the Alaska Pole Vault Club. In her first decathlon, she finished runner-up at the 2023 USA Women's Decathlon Championships.

In February 2024, Bruce set an unofficial American record in the indoor heptathlon – an event typically only contested by men's athletes. Going against primarily French competition, she cleared 10 ft 6 1/4 in (3.2 m) in the pole vault to set an Alaskan record in that event and placed runner-up overall with 5,226 points. Outdoors, Bruce finished 3rd in the heptathlon at the Drake Relays. At the inaugural 2024 Women's Decathlon World Championships, Bruce won the bronze medal behind Allison Halverson and Roseva Bidois. She had the farthest javelin throw of all the competitors and finished two points ahead of the fourth-place finisher. She was a finalist for the Alaska Sports Hall of Fame induction in November 2024.

In 2025, Bruce finished 3rd in the X-Athletics meet in Aubière as part of the World Athletics Combined Events Tour. She returned to the 2025 Women's Decathlon World Championships, where she jumped a personal best of 19 ft 0 in (5.79 m) in the long jump. She finished the first day of competition in 6th place, but set additional personal bests in the discus throw, pole vault, and javelin to advance to 3rd place. Following her second bronze medal, Bruce was named the Alaska Athlete of the Week by the Alaska Sports Report.

== Personal life ==
Bruce studied actuarial science at Illinois State University. She is sponsored by Lululemon and currently trains in Texas, though she has lived in Wisconsin, Germany, South Dakota, Hawaii, South Korea, Illinois, and Alaska in the past as a military dependent.

Bruce enjoys hiking in Alaska. Her favorite athlete is Dalilah Muhammad. Bruce has said she doesn't have a favorite event in the heptathlon, but that the heptathlon itself is her favorite event.

Bruce is also an actuary at USAA and a volunteer assistant coach for the Trinity Tigers track and field program.
