= Nikki Boon =

Dutch heptathlete (born 2001)

Personal information
- Born: 1 August 2001 (age 25)

Sport
- Country: Netherlands
- Sport: Athletics
- Events: Heptathlon; Decathlon
Medal record
Women's athletics
Representing the Netherlands
Decathlon World Championships
Gold medal – first place	2025 Geneva	Decathlon
Bronze medal – third place	2026 Oberlin	Decathlon

Nikki Boon (born 1 August 2001) is a Dutch heptathlete and decathlete. She won the pentathlon and decathlon at the 2025 NCAA Division III Women's Indoor Track and Field Championships and NCAA Division III Women's Outdoor Track and Field Championships for the Emory Eagles track and field team, and won the gold medal at the 2nd Women's Decathlon World Championships.

== Career ==
=== Netherlands ===
Boon attended the Centrum voor Topsport en Onderwijs (Center for Sports and Education) high school in the Netherlands and represented the AV Flevo Delta athletics club. She competed at the 2015 Dutch U18 Athletics Championships in the shot put and placed 7th in the indoor pentathlon at the 2016 Dutch U18 Indoor Combined Events Championships. She improved to runner-up at the 2017 edition as well as placing 3rd in the long jump individually. She was 4th at the 2018 Dutch U18 Indoor Combined Events Championships in the pentathlon.

Boon won the Dronten Sportswoman of the Year award in 2017 and 2018. She competed in her first senior nationals at the 2019 Dutch Athletics Championships, but did not finish in the heptathlon. She was 14th in the pentathlon and won the heptathlon at the Dutch U20 indoor and outdoor championships that year respectively.

=== Coastal Carolina University ===
In 2020, Boon was recruited to the Coastal Carolina Chanticleers track and field team in Conway, South Carolina. She experienced a season-ending injury in her first year of NCAA Division I competition. In early January 2020, Boon fell during hurdle training and injured her ankle requiring crutches.

Boon was 6th in the Sun Belt Conference indoor pentathlon championship in 2021, 3rd in 2022, and 4th in 2023. Boon was also 3rd in the Sun Belt Conference heptathlon championships in 2022.

=== Emory University ===
Boon started graduate school for the Emory Eagles track and field team in 2024. She qualified for the NCAA Division III Women's Indoor Track and Field Championships in her first season, finishing national runner-up in the pentathlon. Outdoors, she placed 20th in the long jump, 3rd in the 4 × 100 metres relay, and runner-up in the heptathlon at the 2024 NCAA Division III Women's Outdoor Track and Field Championships by 38 points.

At the 2025 NCAA Division III Women's Indoor Track and Field Championships, Boon became Emory's first national indoor pentathlon champion and became the first NCAA Division III athlete to score over 4,000 points. Winning the event by over 300 points, she was the second Emory athlete to earn a national title in any track and field event. Boon was also 5th in the indoor 4 × 400 metres relay. At the 2025 Division III Outdoor Championships, Boon was 10th in the long jump and won the heptathlon, setting another Division III record of 5,638 points in the process.

=== Decathlon ===
Boon entered in the 2025 Women's Decathlon World Championships, set to be held at the same venue as that year's NCAA Division III outdoor championships in Geneva, Ohio. Following runner-up finishes in the long jump, shot put, and 400 m, Boon sat in second place behind American Katie Straus after the first day of competition.

Boon finished runner-up in the discus throw and 3rd in the javelin throw to surpass Straus, beating her in the 1500 m to win the gold medal. Her winning mark of 7,451 points set a championship record, surpassing Allison Halverson's 7,236 points from the inaugural competition.

== Personal life ==
Boon is from Dronten in the Netherlands. She majored in psychology at Coastal Carolina University. She has a master's degree in biological and biomedical science from the Laney Graduate School at Emory.

Four of Boon's immediate family members are also combined track and field events competitors. Boon's father was a decathlete, her mother was a heptathlete, and she has two brothers that are also decathletes. Her brother Scott Boon is a decathlete for the Houston Baptist Huskies track and field team.
