= Decathlon =

Athletic track and field competition consisting of ten events

Athletics Decathlon
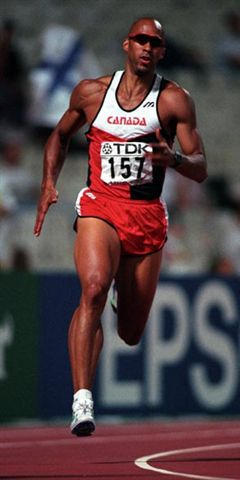
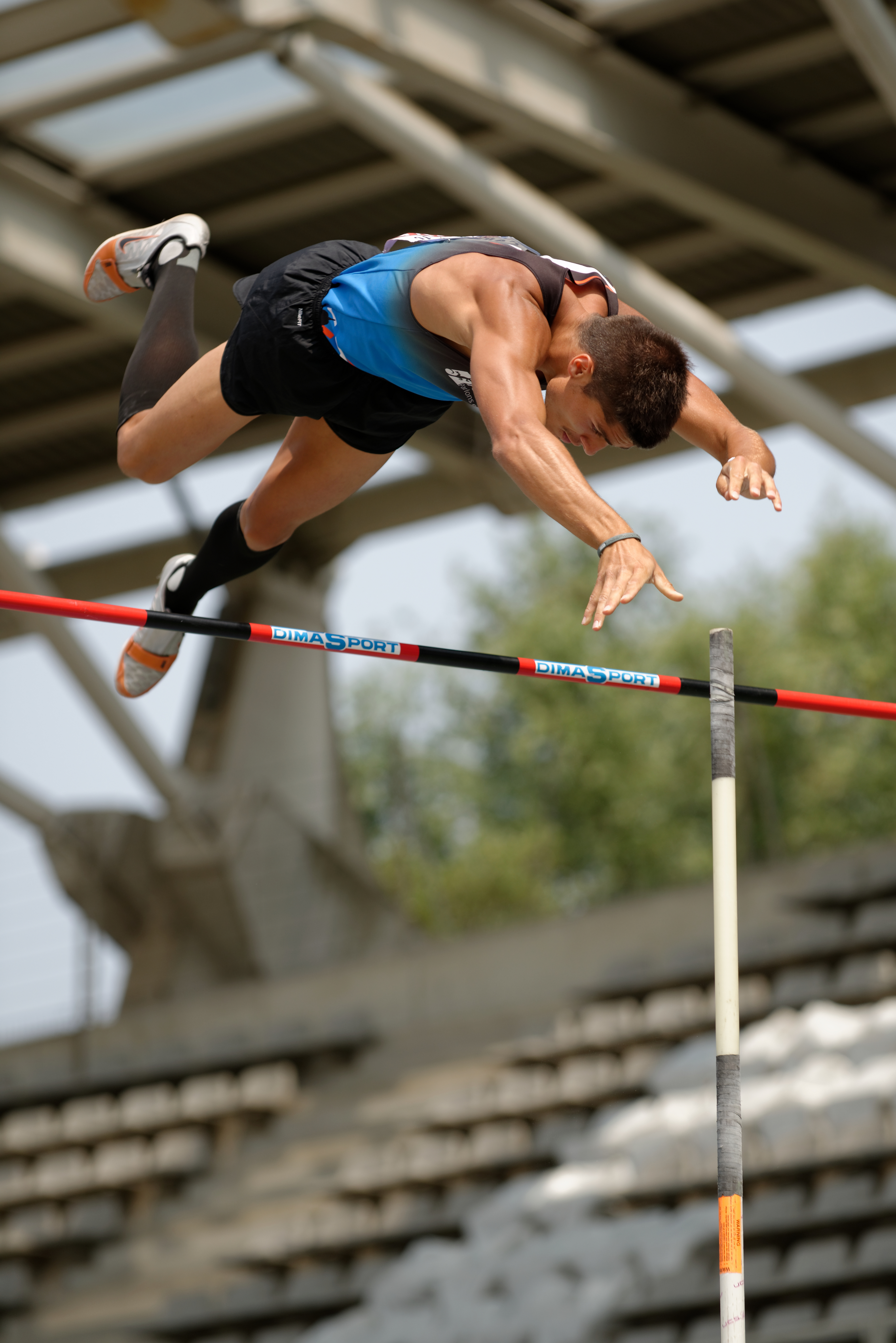
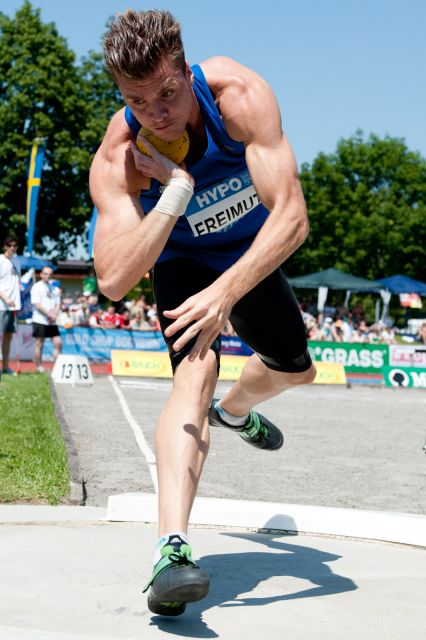
- Decathlon combines four runs, three jumps, and three throws.

World records
- Men: (France) Kevin Mayer 9126 pts (2018)
- Women: (Lithuania) Austra Skujytė 8358 pts (2005)

Olympic records
- Men: (Canada) Damian Warner 9018 pts (2021)

World Championship records
- Men: (United States) Ashton Eaton 9045 pts (2015)

The decathlon is a combined event in athletics consisting of 10 track and field events. The word was formed in analogy to the word "pentathlon", from Greek δέκα (déka 'ten') and ἆθλον (áthlon 'contest, prize'). Events are held over two consecutive days and the winners are determined by the combined performance in all. Performance is judged not by the position achieved but rather on a points system in each event. The decathlon is contested mainly by male athletes, while female athletes typically compete in the heptathlon.

Traditionally, the title of "World's Greatest Athlete" has been given to the person who wins the decathlon. This began when Gustav V of Sweden told Jim Thorpe, "Sir, you are the world's greatest athlete" after Thorpe won the decathlon at the Stockholm Olympics in 1912.

The event is similar to the pentathlon held at the ancient Greek Olympics, and also similar to a competition called an "all-around", which was contested at the United States amateur championships in 1884. Another all-around was held at the 1904 Summer Olympics. The modern decathlon first appeared at the 1912 Games.

In modern athletics, the 10 events are: 100 metres, long jump, shot put, high jump, 400 metres, 110 metres hurdles, discus throw, pole vault, javelin throw, and 1500 metres. The current official decathlon world record holder is French athlete Kevin Mayer, who scored a total of 9126 points at the 2018 Décastar in France.

== Historical background ==
The decathlon developed from the ancient pentathlon competitions held at the ancient Greek Olympics. Pentathlons involved five disciplines – long jump, discus throw, javelin throw, sprint and a wrestling match. Introduced in Olympia during 708 BC, this competition was extremely popular for many centuries.

A ten-event competition known as the "all-around" or "all-round" championship, similar to the modern decathlon, was first contested at the United States amateur championships in 1884 and reached a consistent form by 1890. While an all-around event was held at the 1904 Summer Olympics, whether it was an official Olympic event has been disputed.

The modern decathlon first appeared in the Olympic athletics program at the 1912 Games in Stockholm.

== Format ==
=== Men's decathlon ===
The vast majority of international and top-level men's decathlons are divided into a two-day competition, with the track and field events held in the order below. Traditionally, all decathletes who finish the event, rather than just the winner or medal-winning athletes, do a round of honour together after the competition. The current world record holder is Kevin Mayer from France with 9126 points which he set on 16 September 2018, in Talence, France.

Day 1

- 100 metres
- Long jump
- Shot put
- High jump
- 400 metres

Day 2

- 110 metres hurdles
- Discus throw
- Pole vault
- Javelin throw
- 1500 metres

=== Women's decathlon ===
At major championships, the women's equivalent of the decathlon is the seven-event heptathlon; before 1981 it was the five-event pentathlon. However, in 2001, the IAAF (now World Athletics) approved scoring tables for a women's decathlon; the current world record holder is Austra Skujytė of Lithuania, with 8358 points. Women's disciplines differ from men's in the same way as for standalone events: the shot, discus, and javelin weigh less, and the sprint hurdles use lower hurdles over 100 m rather than 110 m. The points tables used are the same as for the heptathlon in the shared events. In some women's decathlon competitions, the schedule differs from the men's decathlon, with the field events switched between day one and day two. This rule was initially instituted to avoid scheduling conflicts when men's and women's decathlon competitions take place simultaneously, however by 2024 the rule was revised to allow conducting the women's decathlon using the men's event order. The inaugural Women's Decathlon World Championships used the men's ordering of events.

Women's decathlon reversed field event order (optional)

Day 1

- 100 metres
- Discus throw
- Pole vault
- Javelin throw
- 400 metres

Day 2

- 100 metres hurdles
- Long jump
- Shot put
- High jump
- 1500 metres

=== One hour ===
The one-hour decathlon is a special type of decathlon in which the athletes have to start the last of ten events (1500 m) within sixty minutes of the start of the first event. The world record holder is Czech decathlete Robert Změlík, who achieved 7897 points at a meeting in Ostrava, Czechoslovakia, in 1992.

=== Masters athletics ===
In Masters athletics, performance scores are age graded before being applied to the standard scoring table. This way, marks that would be competitive within an age division can get rated, even if those marks would not appear on the scale designed for younger age groups. Additionally, like women, the age divisions use different implement weights and lower hurdles. Based on this system, German Rolf Geese in the M60 division and American Robert Hewitt in the M80 divisions have set their respective world records over 8000 points. Using the same scale, Nadine O'Connor scored 10,234 points in the W65 division, the highest decathlon score ever recorded.

== Points system ==
Parameter values by discipline
Event	A	B	C
100 m	25.4347	18	1.81
Long jump	0.14354	220	1.4
Shot put	51.39	1.5	1.05
High jump	0.8465	75	1.42
400 m	1.53775	82	1.81
110 m hurdles	5.74352	28.5	1.92
Discus throw	12.91	4	1.1
Pole vault	0.2797	100	1.35
Javelin throw	10.14	7	1.08
1500 m	0.03768	480	1.85

The 2001 IAAF points tables use the following formulae:

- Points = INT(A(B − P)^{C}) for track events (faster time produces a higher score)
- Points = INT(A(P − B)^{C}) for field events (greater distance or height produces a higher score)

A, B, and C are parameters that vary by discipline, as shown in the adjacent table, while P is the performance by the athlete, measured in seconds (running), metres (throwing), or centimetres (jumping).

The decathlon tables should not be confused with the scoring tables compiled by Bojidar Spiriev, to allow comparison of the relative quality of performances by athletes in different events. On those tables, for example, a decathlon score of 9006 points equates to 1265 "comparison points", the same number as a triple jump of 18 m.

=== Benchmarks ===
Split evenly between the events, the following table shows the benchmark levels needed to earn 1000, 900, 800, and 700 points in each sport.

Event	1000 pts	900 pts	800 pts	700 pts	Unit
100 m	10.395	10.827	11.278	11.756	Seconds
Long jump	7.76	7.36	6.94	6.51	Metres
Shot put	18.40	16.79	15.16	13.53	Metres
High jump	2.20	2.10	1.99	1.88	Metres
400 m	46.17	48.19	50.32	52.58	Seconds
110 m hurdles	13.80	14.59	15.419	16.29	Seconds
Discus throw	56.17	51.4	46.59	41.72	Metres
Pole vault	5.28	4.96	4.63	4.29	Metres
Javelin throw	77.19	70.67	64.09	57.45	Metres
1500 m	3:53.79	4:07.42	4:21.77	4:36.96	Minutes:Seconds

=== Calculator ===
Event	Score	Points
100m	s	0
Long Jump	cm	0
Shot Put	m	0
High Jump	cm	0
400m	s	0
Day One	—	0
110mH	s	0
Discus Throw	m	0
Pole Vault	cm	0
Javelin	m	0
1500m	m s	0
Day Two	—	0
Total	—	0

== Records ==
The official men's decathlon world record holder is Kevin Mayer of France, with a score of 9126 points set during the 2018 Décastar in Talence, France, which was ratified by World Athletics.

100m (wind)	Long jump (wind)	Shot put	High jump	400m	110m H (wind)	Discus	Pole vault	Javelin	1500m
10.55 (+0.3 m/s)	7.80 m (+1.2 m/s)	16.00 m	2.05 m	48.42	13.75 (−1.1 m/s)	50.54 m	5.45 m	71.90 m	4:36.11

The previous record from Ashton Eaton (9045 points):

100m (wind)	Long jump (wind)	Shot put	High jump	400m	110m H (wind)	Discus	Pole vault	Javelin	1500m
10.23 (−0.4 m/s)	7.88 m (+0.0 m/s)	14.52 m	2.01 m	45.00 WDB	13.69 (−0.2 m/s)	43.34 m	5.20 m	63.63 m	4:17.52

- Updated 8 August 2026:

Area	Men			Women		
Area	Score	Season	Athlete	Score	Season	Athlete
World	9126	2018	Kevin Mayer (FRA)	8358	2005	Austra Skujytė (LTU)
Area records
Africa (records)	8521	2016	Larbi Bourrada (ALG)	7014 ^{a}	2007	Margaret Simpson (GHA)
Asia (records)	8725	2004	Dmitriy Karpov (KAZ)	7798	2004	Irina Naumenko (KAZ)
Europe (records)	9126	2018	Kevin Mayer (FRA)	8358	2005	Austra Skujytė (LTU)
North, Central America and Caribbean (records)	9045	2015	Ashton Eaton (USA)	8246 ^{b}	2021	Jordan Gray (USA)
Oceania (records)	8649	2021	Ashley Moloney (AUS)	5927 ^{c}	1999	Meagan Rentsch (AUS)
South America (records)	8393	2013	Carlos Chinin (BRA)	6570	2004	Andrea Bordalejo (ARG)

^{a} Decathlon record not officially kept by the Confederation of African Athletics.
^{b} Decathlon record not officially kept by the North American, Central American and Caribbean Athletic Association.
^{c} In 2012 Simone Carrè (AUS) achieved a score of 6428 pts, but it was not ratified by the Oceania Athletics Association.

=== Men ===
The total decathlon score for all world records in the respective events would be 12,687. The total decathlon score for all the best performances achieved during decathlons is 10,685. The Difference column shows the difference in points between the decathlon points that the individual current world record would be awarded and the points awarded to the current decathlon record for that event. The relative differences in points are much higher in throwing events than in running and jumping events.

Decathlon bests are only recognized when an athlete completes the ten-event competition with a score of over 7000 points.

Men's world records (WR) compared to decathlon bests (DB)
Event	Type	Athlete	Record	Score	Diff	Date	Place	Ref.
100 m	WR	Usain Bolt (JAM)	9.58 (+0.9 m/s)	1202	136	16 August 2009	Berlin	
100 m	DB	Damian Warner (CAN)	10.12 (+0.9 m/s)	1066		25 May 2019	Götzis	
Long jump	WR	Mike Powell (USA)	8.95 m (29 ft 4 1/4 in) (+0.3 m/s)	1312	118	30 August 1991	Tokyo	
Long jump	DB	Simon Ehammer (SUI)	8.51 m (27 ft 11 in) (+1.0 m/s)	1194		30 May 2026	Götzis	
Shot put	WR	Ryan Crouser (USA)	23.56 m (77 ft 3 1/2 in)	1323	275	27 May 2023	Los Angeles	
Shot put	DB	Edy Hubacher (SUI)	19.17 m (62 ft 10 1/2 in)	1048		5 October 1969	Bern	
High jump	WR	Javier Sotomayor (CUB)	2.45 m (8 ft 1/4 in)	1244	173	27 July 1993	Salamanca	
High jump	DB	Derek Drouin (CAN)	2.28 m (7 ft 5 3/4 in)	1071		7 April 2017	Santa Barbara	
400 m	WR	Wayde van Niekerk (RSA)	43.03	1164	104	14 August 2016	Rio de Janeiro	
400 m	DB	Ashton Eaton (USA)	45.00	1060		28 August 2015	Beijing	
110 m hurdles	WR	Ja'Kobe Tharp (USA)	12.75 (+1.0 m/s)	1142	83	10 June 2026	Eugene	
110 m hurdles	DB	Damian Warner (CAN)	13.36 (+0.9 m/s)	1059		30 May 2021	Götzis	
Discus throw	WR	Mykolas Alekna (LTU)	75.56 m (247 ft 10 3/4 in)	1416	384	13 April 2025	Ramona	
Discus throw	DB	Leo Neugebauer (GER)	57.70 m (189 ft 3 1/2 in)	1032		6 June 2024	Eugene	
Pole vault	WR	Armand Duplantis (SWE)	6.31 m (20 ft 8 1/4 in)	1335	183	12 March 2026	Uppsala	
Pole vault	DB	Tim Lobinger (GER)	5.76 m (18 ft 10 3/4 in)	1152		16 September 1999	Leverkusen	
Javelin throw	WR	Jan Železný (CZE)	98.48 m (323 ft 1 in)	1331	291	25 May 1996	Jena	
Javelin throw	DB	Peter Blank (GER)	79.80 m (261 ft 9 1/2 in)	1040		19 July 1992	Emmelshausen	
1500 m	WR	Hicham El Guerrouj (MAR)	3:26.00	1218	255	14 July 1998	Rome	
1500 m	DB	Robert Baker (USA)	3:58.7h	963		3 April 1980	Austin	
Total	World records			12,687	2002			
Total	Decathlon bests			10,685				

=== Women ===
Women's decathlon bests (DB)
Event	Athlete	Record	Score	Date	Place	Ref.
100 m	Esther Conde-Turpin (FRA)	11.80	991	8 August 2026	Oberlin	
Long jump	Jordan Gray (USA)	6.19 m (20 ft 3 1/2 in)	908	4 October 2020	Austin	
Shot put	Austra Skujyte (LTU)	16.46 m (54 ft 0 in)	959	14 April 2006	Columbia	
High jump	Austra Skujyte (LTU)	1.86 m (6 ft 1 in)	1054	14 April 2006	Columbia	
400 m	Ester Goossens (NED)	54.0h (Note: World Athletics does not recognize Goossens' decathlon, and instead marks 54.82 by Hannah Hill as combined best performance.)	951	5 October 1997	Apeldoorn	
100 m hurdles	Esther Conde-Turpin (FRA)	13.39	1066	9 August 2026	Oberlin	
Discus throw	Austra Skujyte (LTU)	49.21 m (161 ft 5 1/4 in)	836	14 April 2006	Columbia	
Pole vault	Breanna Eveland (USA)	4.30 m (14 ft 1 1/4 in)	1108	14 April 2006	Columbia	
Javelin throw	Barbora Spotakova (CZE)	58.42 m (191 ft 8 in)	1024	26 September 2004	Talence	
1500 m	Corinn Brewer (USA)	4:50.76	889	9 August 2026	Oberlin	

== All-time top 25 men ==
- Correct as of July 2026.

Rank	Score	Athlete	Date	Place	Ref.
1	9126	Kevin Mayer (FRA)	15–16 September 2018	Talence	
1	( 10.55/+0.3 - 7.80/+1.2 - 16.00 - 2.05 - 48.42 / 13.75/-1.1 - 50.54 - 5.45 - 71.90 - 4:36.11 )				
2	9045	Ashton Eaton (USA)	28–29 August 2015	Beijing	
2	( 10.23/-0.4 - 7.88/0.0 - 14.52 - 2.01 - 45.00 / 13.69/-0.2 - 43.34 - 5.20 - 63.63 - 4:17.52 )				
3	9026	Roman Šebrle (CZE)	26–27 May 2001	Götzis	
3	( 10.64/0.0 - 8.11/+1.9 - 15.33 - 2.12 - 47.79 / 13.92/-0.2 - 47.92 - 4.80 - 70.16 - 4:21.98 )				
4	9018	Damian Warner (CAN)	4–5 August 2021	Tokyo	
4	( 10.12/+0.2 - 8.24/+0.2 - 14.80 - 2.02 - 47.48 / 13.46/-1.0 - 48.67 - 4.90 - 63.44 - 4:31.08 )				
5	8994	Tomáš Dvořák (CZE)	3–4 July 1999	Prague	
5	( 10.54/-0.1 - 7.90/+1.1 - 16.78 - 2.04 - 48.08 / 13.73/0.0 - 48.33 - 4.90 - 72.32 - 4:37.20 )				
6	8961	Leo Neugebauer (GER)	5–6 June 2024	Eugene	
6	( 10.64/+0.1 - 7.86/+0.9 - 17.46 - 2.07 - 48.03 / 14.36/0.0 - 57.70 - 5.21 - 56.64 - 4:44.61 )				
7	8909	Pierce LePage (CAN)	25–26 August 2023	Budapest	
7	( 10.45/-0.3 - 7.59/+0.2 - 15.81 - 2.08 - 47.21 / 13.77/+0.2 - 50.98 - 5.20 - 60.90 - 4:39.88 )				
7	8909	Sander Skotheim (NOR)	31 May – 1 June 2025	Götzis	
7	( 10.70/+0.7 - 8.06/+0.7 - 13.98 - 2.15 - 47.47 / 14.12/-1.2 - 49.18 - 5.10 - 61.46 - 4:23.88 )				
9	8891	Dan O'Brien (USA)	4–5 September 1992	Talence	
9	( 10.43/+2.1 - 8.08/+1.8 - 16.69 - 2.07 - 48.51 / 13.98/-0.5 - 48.56 - 5.00 - 62.58 - 4:42.10 )				
10	8869	Kyle Garland (USA)	31 July – 1 August 2025	Eugene	
10	( 10.44/+1.1 - 7.89/+1.3 - 16.95 - 2.14 - 49.29 / 13.78/-0.6 - 50.93 - 4.80 - 65.52 - 4:54.50 )				
11	8867	Garrett Scantling (USA)	6–7 May 2022	Fayetteville	
11	( 10.61/-0.3 - 7.68/+2.4 - 16.27 - 2.04 - 47.08 / 14.10/+3.1 - 55.06 - 5.21 - 57.45 - 4:48.00 )				
12	8832	Bryan Clay (USA)	29–30 June 2008	Eugene	
12	( 10.39/-0.4 - 7.39/-1.6 - 15.17 - 2.08 - 48.41 / 13.75/+1.9 - 52.74 - 5.00 - 70.55 - 4:50.97 )				
13	8815	Erki Nool (EST)	6–7 August 2001	Edmonton	
13	( 10.60/+1.5 - 7.63/+2.0 - 14.90 - 2.03 - 46.23 / 14.40/0.0 - 43.40 - 5.40 - 67.01 - 4:29.58 )				
14	8811	Daley Thompson (GBR)	27–28 August 1986	Stuttgart	
14	( 10.26/+2.0 - 7.72/+1.0 - 15.73 - 2.00 - 47.02 / 14.04/-0.3 - 43.38 - 5.10 - 62.78 - 4:26.16 )				
15	8796	Markus Rooth (NOR)	2–3 August 2024	Saint-Denis	
15	( 10.71/+0.9 - 7.80/-0.2 - 15.25 - 1.99 - 47.69 / 14.25/+0.2 - 49.80 - 5.30 - 66.87 - 4:39.56 )				
16	8790	Trey Hardee (USA)	19–20 August 2009	Berlin	
16	( 10.45/+0.2 - 7.83/+1.9 - 15.33 - 1.99 - 48.13 / 13.86/+0.3 - 48.08 - 5.20 - 68.00 - 4:48.91 )				
17	8784	Tom Pappas (USA)	21–22 June 2003	Palo Alto	
17	( 10.78/+0.2 - 7.96/+1.4 - 16.28 - 2.17 - 48.22 / 14.13/+1.7 - 45.84 - 5.20 - 60.77 - 4:48.12 )				
17	8784	Ayden Owens-Delerme (PUR)	20–21 September 2025	Tokyo	
17	( 10.31/+0.2 - 7.32/+0.4 - 15.55 - 1.96 - 46.46 / 13.65/+1.1 - 46.12 - 5.10 - 58.79 - 4:17.91 )				
19	8778	Simon Ehammer (SUI)	30–31 May 2026	Götzis	
19	( 10.41/+1.7 - 8.51/+1.0 - 15.15 - 2.03 - 47.33 / 13.48/-0.7 - 41.09 - 5.20 - 54.38 - 4:43.22 )				
20	8764	Johannes Erm (EST)	10–11 June 2024	Rome	
20	( 10.60/+0.4 - 7.91/+0.2 - 14.99 - 1.99 - 46.81 / 14.30/-0.5 - 44.56 - 5.20 - 62.71 - 4:24.95 )				
21	8756	Lindon Victor (GRN)	25–26 August 2023	Budapest	
21	( 10.60/+0.1 - 7.55/+1.0 - 15.94 - 2.02 - 48.05 / 14.47/+0.2 - 54.97 - 4.80 - 68.05 - 4:39.67 )				
22	8735	Eduard Hämäläinen (BLR)	28–29 May 1994	Götzis	
22	( 10.50/+2.1 - 7.26/+1.0 - 16.05 - 2.11 - 47.63 / 13.82/-3.0 - 49.70 - 4.90 - 60.32 - 4:35.09 )				
23	8730	Jürgen Hingsen (FRG)	27–28 August 1986	Stuttgart	
23	( 10.87/+2.5 - 7.89/+2.8 - 16.46 - 2.12 - 48.79 / 14.52/-0.3 - 48.42 - 4.60 - 64.38 - 4:21.61 )				
24	8725	Dmitriy Karpov (KAZ)	23–24 August 2004	Athens	
24	( 10.50/+2.2 - 7.81/-0.9 - 15.93 - 2.09 - 46.81 / 13.97/+1.5 - 51.65 - 4.60 - 55.54 - 4:38.11 )				
25	8706	Frank Busemann (GER)	31 July – 1 August 1996	Atlanta	
25	( 10.60/ - 8.07/+0.8 - 13.60 - 2.04 - 48.34 / 13.47/+0.3 - 45.04 - 4.80 - 66.86 - 4:31.41 )				

=== Notes ===
Below is a list of other scores equal or superior to 8720 pts:

- Ashton Eaton also scored 9039 (2012), 8893 (2016), 8809 (2013) and 8750 (2016).
- Damian Warner also scored 8995 (2021), 8804 (2023), 8797 (2022) and 8795 (2018).
- Tomáš Dvořák also scored 8902 (2001), 8900 (2000) and 8837 (1997).
- Roman Šebrle also scored 8893 (2004), 8807 (2003), 8800 (2002) and 8757 (2000).
- Leo Neugebauer also scored 8836 (2023), 8804 (2025), 8748 (2024) and 8730 (2026).
- Kevin Mayer also scored 8834 (2016), 8816 (2022) and 8768 (2017).
- Dan O'Brien also scored 8824 (1996), 8812 (1991) and 8755 (1998).
- Bryan Clay also scored 8791 (2008).
- Tom Pappas also scored 8750 (2003).
- Ayden Owens-Delerme also scored 8732 (2024).
- Kyle Garland also scored 8720 (2022).

== All-time top 25 women ==
- Correct as of August 2026.

Rank	Score	Athlete	Date	Place	Ref.
1	8358	Austra Skujyte (LTU)	15 April 2005	Columbia	
1	( 12.49/+1.6 - 6.12/+1.6 - 16.42 - 1.78 - 57.19 / 14.22/+2.4 - 46.19 - 3.10 - 48.78 - 5:15.86 )				
2	8246	Jordan Gray (USA)	22 August 2021	San Mateo	
2	( 11.86/+4.6 - 6.12/+2.0 - 14.25 - 1.71 - 57.27 / 14.43/-2.5 - 39.84 - 3.91 - 41.14 - 5:20.27 )				
3	8150	Marie Collonvillé (FRA)	26 September 2004	Talence	
3	( 12.48/+0.4 - 6.18/+1.0 - 11.90 - 1.80 - 56.15 / 13.96/+0.4 - 34.69 - 3.50 - 47.19 - 5:06.09 )				
4	7900	Camryn Newton-Smith (AUS)	8–9 August 2026	Geneva	
4	( 11.83/+1.4 - 6.17/+0.2 - 12.86 - 1.75 - 55.41 / 13.61/+0.3 - 34.22 - 3.50 - 37.15 - 5:48.49 )				
5	7885	Mona Steigauf (GER)	21 September 1997	Ahlen	
5	( 12.15/+1.2 - 5.93/0.0 - 12.49 - 1.73 - 55.34 / 13.75/+0.2 - 34.68 - 3.10 - 42.24 - 5:07.95 )				
6	7805	Noemie Desailly (FRA)	8–9 August 2026	Geneva	
6	( 12.01/+1.4 - 6.09/0.0 - 13.91 - 1.57 - 55.59 / 14.13/+0.3 - 39.65 - 3.40 - 34.73 - 5:18.30 )				
7	7798	Irina Naumenko (KAZ)	26 September 2004	Talence	
7	( 12.58/+0.4 - 5.98/+1.0 - 12.51 - 1.77 - 55.91 / 14.42/+0.4 - 34.63 - 3.30 - 37.57 - 4:59.03 )				
8	7742	Anna Snetkova (RUS)	20 September 2003	Krasnodar	
8	( 12.66/NWI - 5.98/NWI - 13.48 - 1.69 - 58.88 / 14.19/NWI - 36.9 - 3.70 - 37.50 - 5:17.67 )				
9	7714	Nikki Boon (NED)	8–9 August 2026	Geneva	
9	( 12.05/+0.2 - 5.77/+1.3 - 13.27 - 1.57 - 56.35 / 14.34/+0.6 - 39.54 - 3.50 - 35.73 - 5:08.74 )				
10	7704	Esther Conde-Turpin (FRA)	8–9 August 2026	Geneva	
10	( 11.80/+1.4 - 5.96/+2.4 - 13.42 - 1.69 - 56.07 / 13.39/+0.3 - 33.15 - 2.30 - 43.64 - 5:07.89 )				
11	7698	Roseva Bidois (FRA)	8–9 August 2026	Geneva	
11	( 12.07/+0.2 - 6.03/+2.8 - 14.04 - 1.60 - 56.04 / 14.53/+0.6 - 44.19 - 3.40 - 31.19 - 5:29.61 )				
12	7577	Tiffany Lott-Hogan (USA)	10 September 2000	Lage	
12	( 12.31/0.0 - 5.77/0.0 - 13.86 - 1.69 - 58.01 / 13.57/0.0 - 38.39 - 3.00 - 46.93 - 6:01.24 )				
13	7573	Alysa Henry (USA)	8–9 August 2026	Geneva	
13	( 12.20/+1.4 - 5.78/+1.5 - 11.97 - 1.75 - 59.60 / 14.51/+0.6 - 31.98 - 3.90 - 43.59 - 5:52.69 )				
14	7470	Julie Mezerette-Martin (FRA)	28 October 2001	Arles	
14	( 12.15/NWI - 5.87/NWI - 11.52 - 1.75 - 56.86 / 14.59/NWI - 36.98 - 2.60 - 38.76 - 5:02.92 )				
15	7301	Katie Straus (USA)	18 August 2025	Geneva	
15	( 12.24/+0.5 - 5.65/+0.7 - 11.58 - 1.72 - 57.47 / 14.23/0.0 - 27.24 - 3.50 - 32.21 - 5:20.36 )				
16	7272	Jordyn Bruce (USA)	18 August 2025	Geneva	
16	( 12.51/+0.5 - 5.79/0.0 - 10.98 - 1.57 - 58.58 / 14.06/0.0 - 31.5 - 3.40 - 41.69 - 5:20.66 )				
17	7245	Magalis Garcia (CUB)	29 June 2002	Vienna	
17	( 12.03/NWI - 5.53/NWI - 13.69 - 1.72 - 59.88 / 13.92/NWI - 35.98 - 2.30 - 47.12 - 5:46.14 )				
18	7236	Allison Halverson (ARM)	4 August 2024	Geneva	
18	( 11.92/+1.4 - 5.88/0.0 - 11.94 - 1.64 - 55.86 / 13.87/+2.0 - 24.47 - 2.73 - 37.13 - 5:18.08 )				
19	7233	Tiia Hautala (FIN)	13 September 1997	Kangasala	
19	( 12.51/+1.3 - 5.95/+0.3 - 12.97 - 1.70 - 58.24 / 14.37/-0.1 - 29.38 - 2.70 - 39.98 - 5:20.76 )				
20	7184	Kim Schiemenz (USA)	17 April 2003	Azusa	
20	( 12.35/0.0 - 5.63/-1.2 - 11.86 - 1.74 - 54.99 / 14.26/-0.2 - 29.09 - 2.84 - 35.24 - 5:32.01 )				
21	7146	Gabriela Kouassi (FRA)	27 October 2002	Arles	
21	( 12.79/+1.5 - 5.32/+0.6 - 12.43 - 1.66 - 59.46 / 14.40/-0.1 - 32.47 - 3.00 - 43.12 - 5:11.38 )				
22	7082	Sabine Schulte (GER)	10 September 2000	Lage	
22	( 12.30/0.0 - 5.68/+0.5 - 10.73 - 1.63 - 56.72 / 14.35/0.0 - 26.36 - 4.10 - 27.29 - 5:58.37 )				
23	7064	Breanna Eveland (USA)	14 April 2006	Columbia	
23	( 13.05/+1.5 - 5.30/+0.7 - 11.66 - 1.50 - 62.85 / 15.04/+0.5 - 40.37 - 4.30 - 36.72 - 5:36.66 )				
24	7044	Stephanie Fuchs (GER)	10 September 2000	Lage	
24	( 12.49/-0.2 - 5.67/0.0 - 12.75 - 1.60 - 57.44 / 14.67/0.0 - 34.87 - 2.50 - 41.15 - 5:24.79 )				
25	7028	Irina Ilyina (RUS)	20 September 2003	Krasnodar	
25	Unknown				

=== Notes ===
Below is a list of other scores equal or superior to 7700 pts:

- Austra Skujytė also scored 8091 pts (2006).
- Noemie Desailly also scored 7705 pts (2024).

== Competitions ==
=== Olympic medalists ===
Games	Gold	Silver	Bronze
1912 Stockholm	Jim Thorpe; United States	Hugo Wieslander; Sweden; Charles Lomberg; Sweden	Gösta Holmér; Sweden
1920 Antwerp	Helge Løvland; Norway	Brutus Hamilton; United States	Bertil Ohlson; Sweden
1924 Paris	Harold Osborn; United States	Emerson Norton; United States	Aleksander Klumberg; Estonia
1928 Amsterdam	Paavo Yrjölä; Finland	Akilles Järvinen; Finland	Ken Doherty; United States
1932 Los Angeles	Jim Bausch; United States	Akilles Järvinen; Finland	Wolrad Eberle; Germany
1936 Berlin	Glenn Morris; United States	Bob Clark; United States	Jack Parker; United States
1948 London	Bob Mathias; United States	Ignace Heinrich; France	Floyd Simmons; United States
1952 Helsinki	Bob Mathias; United States	Milt Campbell; United States	Floyd Simmons; United States
1956 Melbourne	Milt Campbell; United States	Rafer Johnson; United States	Vasili Kuznetsov; Soviet Union
1960 Rome	Rafer Johnson; United States	Yang Chuan-kwang; Formosa	Vasili Kuznetsov; Soviet Union
1964 Tokyo	Willi Holdorf; United Team of Germany	Rein Aun; Soviet Union	Hans-Joachim Walde; United Team of Germany
1968 Mexico City	Bill Toomey; United States	Hans-Joachim Walde; West Germany	Kurt Bendlin; West Germany
1972 Munich	Mykola Avilov; Soviet Union	Leonid Lytvynenko; Soviet Union	Ryszard Katus; Poland
1976 Montreal	Bruce Jenner (Note: Jenner is now known as Caitlyn due to gender transition in 2015.); United States	Guido Kratschmer; West Germany	Mykola Avilov; Soviet Union
1980 Moscow	Daley Thompson; Great Britain	Yuriy Kutsenko; Soviet Union	Sergei Zhelanov; Soviet Union
1984 Los Angeles	Daley Thompson; Great Britain	Jürgen Hingsen; West Germany	Siegfried Wentz; West Germany
1988 Seoul	Christian Schenk; East Germany	Torsten Voss; East Germany	Dave Steen; Canada
1992 Barcelona	Robert Změlík; Czechoslovakia	Antonio Peñalver; Spain	Dave Johnson; United States
1996 Atlanta	Dan O'Brien; United States	Frank Busemann; Germany	Tomáš Dvořák; Czech Republic
2000 Sydney	Erki Nool; Estonia	Roman Šebrle; Czech Republic	Chris Huffins; United States
2004 Athens	Roman Šebrle; Czech Republic	Bryan Clay; United States	Dmitriy Karpov; Kazakhstan
2008 Beijing	Bryan Clay; United States	Andrei Krauchanka; Belarus	Leonel Suárez; Cuba
2012 London	Ashton Eaton; United States	Trey Hardee; United States	Leonel Suárez; Cuba
2016 Rio De Janeiro	Ashton Eaton; United States	Kevin Mayer; France	Damian Warner; Canada
2020 Tokyo	Damian Warner; Canada	Kevin Mayer; France	Ashley Moloney; Australia
2024 Paris	Markus Rooth; Norway	Leo Neugebauer; Germany	Lindon Victor; Grenada
2028 Los Angeles			

=== World Championships medalists ===
==== Men ====
Championships	Gold	Silver	Bronze
1983 Helsinki	Daley Thompson (GBR)	Jürgen Hingsen (FRG)	Siegfried Wentz (FRG)
1987 Rome	Torsten Voss (GDR)	Siegfried Wentz (FRG)	Pavel Tarnavetskiy (URS)
1991 Tokyo	Dan O'Brien (USA)	Mike Smith (CAN)	Christian Schenk (GER)
1993 Stuttgart	Dan O'Brien (USA)	Eduard Hämäläinen (BLR)	Paul Meier (GER)
1995 Gothenburg	Dan O'Brien (USA)	Eduard Hämäläinen (BLR)	Mike Smith (CAN)
1997 Athens	Tomáš Dvořák (CZE)	Eduard Hämäläinen (FIN)	Frank Busemann (GER)
1999 Seville	Tomáš Dvořák (CZE)	Dean Macey (GBR)	Chris Huffins (USA)
2001 Edmonton	Tomáš Dvořák (CZE)	Erki Nool (EST)	Dean Macey (GBR)
2003 Saint-Denis	Tom Pappas (USA)	Roman Šebrle (CZE)	Dmitriy Karpov (KAZ)
2005 Helsinki	Bryan Clay (USA)	Roman Šebrle (CZE)	Attila Zsivoczky (HUN)
2007 Osaka	Roman Šebrle (CZE)	Maurice Smith (JAM)	Dmitriy Karpov (KAZ)
2009 Berlin	Trey Hardee (USA)	Leonel Suárez (CUB)	Aleksandr Pogorelov (RUS)
2011 Daegu	Trey Hardee (USA)	Ashton Eaton (USA)	Leonel Suárez (CUB)
2013 Moscow	Ashton Eaton (USA)	Michael Schrader (GER)	Damian Warner (CAN)
2015 Beijing	Ashton Eaton (USA)	Damian Warner (CAN)	Rico Freimuth (GER)
2017 London	Kevin Mayer (FRA)	Rico Freimuth (GER)	Kai Kazmirek (GER)
2019 Doha	Niklas Kaul (GER)	Maicel Uibo (EST)	Damian Warner (CAN)
2022 Eugene	Kevin Mayer (FRA)	Pierce LePage (CAN)	Zach Ziemek (USA)
2023 Budapest	Pierce LePage (CAN)	Damian Warner (CAN)	Lindon Victor (GRN)
2025 Tokyo	Leo Neugebauer (GER)	Ayden Owens-Delerme (PUR)	Kyle Garland (USA)

==== Women ====
Games	Gold		Silver		Bronze	
2024 Geneva	Allison Halverson; Armenia	7236 pts	Roseva Bidois; France	6962 pts	Jordyn Bruce; United States	6723 pts
2025 Geneva	Nikki Boon; Netherlands	7451 pts	Katie Straus; United States	7301 pts	Jordyn Bruce; United States	7272 pts
2026 Oberlin	Camryn Newton-Smith; Australia	7900 pts	Noémie Desailly; France	7805 pts	Nikki Boon; Netherlands	7714 pts

=== Continental competitions ===
- African Combined Events Championships
- European Cup Combined Events
- Oceania Combined Events Championships
- Pan American Combined Events Cup

=== Other ===
- IAAF Combined Events Challenge
  - Multistars
  - Hypo-Meeting
  - TNT - Fortuna Meeting
  - Erdgas Mehrkampf-Meeting
  - Décastar

== World leading scores ==
Year	Score	Athlete	Place
1960	8683	Rafer Johnson (USA)	Eugene
1961	8709	Philip Mulkey (USA)	Memphis
1962	8248	Chuan-Kwang Yang (ROC)	Tulare
1963	8089	Chuan-Kwang Yang (ROC)	Walnut
1964	7950	Manfred Bock (FRG)	Liestal
1965	7883	Mykhaylo Storozhenko (URS)	Kiev
1966	8234	Bill Toomey (USA)	Salina
1967	8319	Kurt Bendlin (FRG)	Heidelberg
1968	8222 A	Bill Toomey (USA)	Echo Summit
1969	8417	Bill Toomey (USA)	Los Angeles
1970	8130	Rüdiger Demmig (GDR)	Erfurt
1971	8244	Kurt Bendlin (FRG)	Bonn
1972	8466	Mykola Avilov (URS)	Munich
1973	8163	Lennart Hedmark (SWE)	Bonn
1974	8229	Ryszard Skowronek (POL)	Montreal
1975	8429	Bruce Jenner (USA)	Eugene
1976	8634	Bruce Jenner (USA)	Montreal
1977	8400	Aleksandr Grebenyuk (URS)	Riga
1978	8493	Guido Kratschmer (FRG)	Bernhausen
1979	8476	Guido Kratschmer (FRG)	Krefeld
1980	8667	Guido Kratschmer (FRG)	Bernhausen
1981	8334	Rainer Pottel (GDR)	Birmingham
1982	8774	Daley Thompson (GBR)	Athens
1983	8825	Jürgen Hingsen (FRG)	Bernhausen
1984	8847	Daley Thompson (GBR)	Los Angeles
1985	8559	Torsten Voss (GDR)	Dresden
1986	8811	Daley Thompson (GBR)	Stuttgart
1987	8680	Torsten Voss (GDR)	Rome
1988	8512	Christian Plaziat (FRA)	Talence
1989	8549	Dave Johnson (USA)	Houston
1990	8574	Christian Plaziat (FRA)	Split
1991	8812	Dan O'Brien (USA)	Tokyo
1992	8891	Dan O'Brien (USA)	Talence
1993	8817	Dan O'Brien (USA)	Stuttgart
1994	8735	Eduard Hämäläinen (BLR)	Götzis
1995	8695	Dan O'Brien (USA)	Gothenburg
1996	8824	Dan O'Brien (USA)	Atlanta
1997	8837	Tomáš Dvořák (CZE)	Athens
1998	8755	Dan O'Brien (USA)	Uniondale
1999	8994	Tomáš Dvořák (CZE)	Prague
2000	8900	Tomáš Dvořák (CZE)	Götzis
2001	9026	Roman Šebrle (CZE)	Götzis
2002	8800	Roman Šebrle (CZE)	Götzis
2003	8807	Roman Šebrle (CZE)	Götzis
2004	8893	Roman Šebrle (CZE)	Athens
2005	8732	Bryan Clay (USA)	Helsinki
2006	8677	Bryan Clay (USA)	Götzis
2007	8697	Roman Šebrle (CZE)	Kladno
2008	8832	Bryan Clay (USA)	Eugene
2009	8790	Trey Hardee (USA)	Berlin
2010	8483	Bryan Clay (USA)	Götzis
2011	8729	Ashton Eaton (USA)	Eugene
2012	9039	Ashton Eaton (USA)	Eugene
2013	8809	Ashton Eaton (USA)	Moscow
2014	8616	Andrei Krauchanka (BLR)	Zürich
2015	9045	Ashton Eaton (USA)	Beijing
2016	8893	Ashton Eaton (USA)	Rio de Janeiro
2017	8768	Kevin Mayer (FRA)	London
2018	9126	Kevin Mayer (FRA)	Talence
2019	8711	Damian Warner (CAN)	Götzis
2020	8552	Kevin Mayer (FRA)	Saint-Paul
2021	9018	Damian Warner (CAN)	Tokyo
2022	8867	Garrett Scantling (USA)	Fayetteville
2023	8909	Pierce LePage (CAN)	Budapest
2024	8961	Leo Neugebauer (GER)	Eugene
2025	8909	Sander Skotheim (NOR)	Götzis
2026	8778	Simon Ehammer (SUI)	Götzis

== National records ==
- Updated 4 July 2026.

Men's decathlon national records (equal or superior to 8000 pts)
Score	Country	Athlete	Date	Place	Ref.
9126	France	Kevin Mayer	15–16 September 2018	Talence	
9045	United States	Ashton Eaton	28–29 August 2015	Beijing	
9026	Czech Republic	Roman Šebrle	26–27 April 2001	Götzis	
9018	Canada	Damian Warner	4–5 August 2021	Tokyo	
8961	Germany	Leo Neugebauer	5–6 June 2024	Eugene	
8909	Norway	Sander Skotheim	31 May – 1 June 2025	Götzis	
8847	Great Britain	Daley Thompson	8–9 August 1984	Los Angeles	
8815	Estonia	Erki Nool	6–7 August 2001	Edmonton	
8784	Puerto Rico	Ayden Owens-Delerme	20–21 September 2025	Tokyo	
8778	Switzerland	Simon Ehammer	30–31 May 2026	Götzis	
8756	Grenada	Lindon Victor	25–26 August 2023	Budapest	
8735	Belarus	Eduard Hämäläinen	28–29 May 1994	Götzis	
8730	Finland	Eduard Hämäläinen	5–6 August 1997	Athens	
8725	Kazakhstan	Dmitriy Karpov	23–24 August 2004	Athens	
8709	Ukraine	Aleksandr Apaychev	2–3 June 1984	Neubrandenburg	
8698	Russia	Grigoriy Degtyaryev	21–22 June 1984	Kyiv	
8654	Cuba	Leonel Suárez	3–4 July 2009	Havana	
8649	Australia	Ashley Moloney	4–5 August 2021	Tokyo	
8644	Jamaica	Maurice Smith	31 August – 1 September 2007	Osaka	
8607	Netherlands	Sven Roosen	2–3 August 2024	Saint-Denis	
8573	Iceland	Jón Arnar Magnússon	30–31 May 1998	Götzis	
8566	Poland	Sebastian Chmara	16–17 May 1998	Murcia	
8554	Hungary	Attila Zsivoczky	3–4 June 2000	Götzis	
8526	Spain	Francisco Javier Benet	16–17 May 1998	Murcia	
8521	Algeria	Larbi Bouraada	17–18 August 2016	Rio de Janeiro	
8519	Belgium	Hans Van Alphen	26–27 May 2012	Götzis	
8445	Uzbekistan	Ramil Ganiyev	5–6 August 1997	Athens	
8437	Lithuania	Rišardas Malachovskis	1–2 July 1988	Minsk	
8406	Sweden	Nicklas Wiberg	19–20 August 2009	Berlin	
8398	South Africa	Willem Coertzen	30–31 May 2015	Götzis	
8393	Brazil	Carlos Chinin	7–8 June 2013	São Paulo	
8359	New Zealand	Simon Poelman	21–22 March 1987	Christchurch	
8321	Japan	Yuma Maruyama	15–16 April 2026	Walnut	
8320	Austria	Gernot Kellermayr	29–30 May 1993	Götzis	
8318	Italy	Dario Dester	27–28 June 2026	Ratingen	
8312	Latvia	Edgars Eriņš	26–27 May 2011	Valmiera	
8291 A	Argentina	Tito Steiner	22–23 June 1983	Provo	
8290	China	Qi Haifeng	28–29 May 2005	Götzis	
8288	Moldova	Valeriy Kachanov	20–21 June 1980	Moscow	
8275	Serbia	Mihail Dudaš	10–11 August 2013	Moscow	
8226	Bahamas	Ken Mullings	2–3 August 2024	Saint-Denis	
8213	Portugal	Mário Aníbal	30 June – 1 July 2001	Kaunas	
8199	Bulgaria	Atanas Andonov	20–21 June 1981	Sofia	
8089	Colombia	Julio Angulo	1–2 December 2025	Lima	
8069	Greece	Prodromos Korkizoglou	1–2 July 2000	Ibach	
8065	Chile	Gonzalo Barroilhet	19–20 April 2012	Charlottesville	
8057 NWI	India	Tejaswin Shankar	22–23 May 2026	Ranchi	
8048	Venezuela	Geormi Jaramillo	4–5 May 2018	Barquisimeto	
8024	Nigeria	Jami Schlueter	6–7 June 2026	Dallas	
8023	Tunisia	Hamdi Dhouibi	9–10 August 2005	Helsinki	
8010 h	Chinese Taipei	Yang Chuan-kwang	27–28 April 1963	Walnut	
8004	Ecuador	Andy Preciado	30–31 May 2021	Guayaquil	

Women's decathlon national records (equal or superior to 5000 pts)
Score	Country	Athlete	Date	Place	Ref.
8358	Lithuania	Austra Skujyte	15 April 2005	Columbia	
8246	United States	Jordan Gray	22 August 2021	San Mateo	
8150	France	Marie Collonvillé	26 September 2004	Talence	
7885	Germany	Mona Steigauf	21 September 1997	Ahlen	
7798	Kazakhstan	Irina Naumenko	26 September 2004	Talence	
7742	Russia	Anna Snetkova	20 September 2003	Krasnodar	
7451	Netherlands	Nikki Boon	18 August 2025	Geneva	
7245	Cuba	Magalis Garcia	29 June 2002	Vienna	
7236	Armenia	Allison Halverson	4 August 2024	Geneva	
7233	Finland	Tiia Hautala	13 September 1997	Kangasala	
7014	Ghana	Margaret Simpson	17 April 2007	Réduit	
6877	Great Britain	Jessica Taylor	13 September 2015	Erith	
6846	Canada	Leanna Carriere	17 June 2014	Burlington	
6830	Austria	Marion Obermayr	5 May 2002	Linz	
6749	Czech Republic	Barbora Špotáková	26 September 2004	Talence	
6732	Estonia	Kristella Jurkatamm	15 July 2018	Kohila	
6724	Poland	Elzbieta Raczka	10 September 2000	Lage	
6614	Spain	María Peinado	23 October 2005	Castellón de la Plana	
6599	Italy	Sara Tani	22 October 2006	Udine	
6570 h	Argentina	Andrea Bordalejo	28 November 2004	Rosario	
6570	Ireland	Lara O'Byrne	4 August 2024	Geneva	
6488	Switzerland	Ariana Brugger	4 August 2024	Geneva	
6448	Ukraine	Larisa Teteryuk	7 September 1997	Linz	
6020	Belgium	Jesse Vercruysse	26 September 2010	Schaerbeek	
5871	Mexico	Giselle Burgos	18 August 2025	Geneva	
5844	Japan	Akane Eguchi	9 September 2001	Machida	
5743	Puerto Rico	Daniela Alejandro	4 August 2024	Geneva	
5740	Australia	Preya Carey	9 June 2008	Santa Barbara	
5586	New Zealand	Maria Sartin	4 August 2024	Geneva	
5054 h	Norway	Tove Beate Dahle	12 September 2004	Ski	

== Under-20 records ==
The world decathlon under-20 record is held by Hubert Trościanka, of Poland, who scored 8514 points at the European U20 Championships in Tampere, Finland, from 7-8th August 2025. This score was also the first over the 8500 point mark.

100m (wind)	Long jump (wind)	Shot put	High jump	400m	110m H (wind)	Discus	Pole vault	Javelin	1500m
10.74 s (−0.7 m/s)	7.26 m (+0.3 m/s)	15.48 m	1.94 m	46.21 s	14.23 (−2.0 m/s)	43.36 m	4.80 m	68.87 m	4:28.59

The world decathlon under-20 record using senior implements is held by Torsten Voss, of East Germany, who scored 8397 points in Erfurt, East Germany, from 6–7 July 1982. This was the last record to be ratified because it is no longer a World Athletics under-20 record event.

Key:
NWI = No Wind Indication

100m (wind)	Long jump (wind)	Shot put	High jump	400m	110m H (wind)	Discus	Pole vault	Javelin	1500m
10.76 (NWI)	7.66 m (NWI)	14.41 m	2.09 m	48.37	14.37 (NWI)	41.66 m	4.80 m	62.90 m	4:34.04

Key:
+ = Senior implements
* = 6-kg shot, 1.067-m hurdles, 1.75-kg discus
A = Altitude (over 1000 m)

U20 Record	Score	Athlete	Year
World	8397+	Torsten Voss (GDR)	1982
World	8514	Hubert Trościanka (POL)	2025
Area U20 records
Africa	7548+	Hamdi Dhouibi (TUN)	2011
Africa	7791	Fredriech Pretorius (RSA)	2014
Asia	8041+	Qi Haifeng (CHN)	2002
Europe	8397+	Torsten Voss (GDR)	1982
Europe	8514	Hubert Trościanka (POL)	2025
North, Central America and Caribbean	8257+	Yordani García (CUB)	2007
Oceania	8103+	Ashley Moloney (AUS)	2019
Oceania	8190	Ashley Moloney (AUS)	2018
South America	7422+	Pedro Ferreira da Silva Filho (BRA)	1985
South America	7641*	Andrés Byron Silva (URU)	2005
South America	7762 A	Felipe Vinicius dos Santos (BRA)	2013

=== Decathlon under-20 bests ===
(Within a completed decathlon scoring more than 7000 points)

Event	Specification	Result (Wind)	Score	Athlete	Nation	Date	Meet	Place	Age	Ref.
100 m		10.31 (+3.5 m/s)	1020	Roko Farkaš	Croatia	9 August 2023	European U20 Championships	Jerusalem	18 years, 179 days	
Long jump		7.83 m (+0.4 m/s)	1017	Simon Ehammer	Switzerland	21 September 2019	Swiss Combined Events Championships	Hochdorf	19 years, 226 days	
Shot put	6 kg	17.81 m	963	José San Pastor	Spain	1 May 2021	Campionato España Combinadas de Federaciones Autonómicas	Valladolid	19 years, 86 days	
Shot put	7.26 kg	15.83 m	841	Rob Muzzio	United States	27 April 1983	Penn Relays	Philadelphia	18 years, 306 days	
High jump		2.18 m	973	Igor Drobyshevskiy	Soviet Union	25 May 1985		Simferopol	18 years, 220 days	
400 m		46.21	998	Hubert Trościanka	Poland	7 August 2025	European U20 Championships	Tampere	19 years, 12 days	
First-day score	U20 implements		4387	Tomas Järvinen	Czechia	6 July 2024	Czech U20 Combined Events Championships	Stará Boleslav	18 years, 259 days	
First-day score	Senior implements		4436	Ashley Moloney	Australia	25 May 2019	Hypomeeting	Götzis	19 years, 73 days	
110 m hurdles	0.991 m	13.57 (−0.1 m/s)	1031	Simon Ehammer	Switzerland	20 July 2019	European U20 Championships	Borås	19 years, 163 days	
110 m hurdles	1.067 m	13.77 (+1.3 m/s)	1004	Ladji Doucouré	France	10 June 2001	Meeting International d'Arles	Arles	18 years, 74 days	
Discus throw	1.75 kg	54.75 m	970	Aleksey Sysoyev	Russia	29 May 2004	Russian Junior Combined Events Cup	Krasnodar	19 years, 82 days	
Discus throw	1.75 kg	54.75 m	970	Jan Doležal	Czech Republic	19 July 2015	European Junior Championships	Eskilstuna	19 years, 43 days	
Discus throw	2 kg	51.86 m	909	Aleksandr Agafonov	Soviet Union	12 June 1980		Gomel	19 years, 36 days	
Pole vault		5.50 m	1067	Lawrence Johnson	United States	8 April 1993	Sea Ray Relays	Knoxville	19 years, 7 days	
Pole vault		5.50 m	1067	Lawrence Johnson	United States	14 May 1993	SEC Outdoor Track and Field Championships	Knoxville	18 years, 336 days	
Pole vault		5.50 m	1067	Baptiste Thiery	France	19 September 2020	French Youth Combined Events Championships	Aubagne	19 years, 82 days	
Javelin throw		71.59 m	914	Niklas Kaul	Germany	20 July 2016	World U20 Championships	Bydgoszcz	18 years, 160 days	
Javelin throw	Old model	76.52 m	989	Aleksandr Apaychev	Soviet Union	1 June 1980		Potsdam	19 years, 26 days	
1500 m		4:04.1 h	923	Dietmar Jentsch	East Germany	16 June 1979		Erfurt	19 years, 98 days	
Second-day score	U20 implements		4265	Niklas Kaul	Germany	23 July 2017	European U20 Championships	Grosseto	19 years, 162 days	
Second-day score	Senior implements		3995	Qi Haifeng	China	22 November 2001	Chinese National Games	Guangzhou	18 years, 107 days	

== Other multiple event contests ==
- Aquathlon
- Biathlon
- Chess-boxing
- CrossFit Games
- Duathlon
- Heptathlon
- Icosathlon or double decathlon
- Modern pentathlon
- Nordic combined
- Octathlon
- Omnium
- Quadrathlon
- Strongman
- Triathlon

== See also ==
- Decathlon world record progression
- List of decathlon national champions (men)
