= Camryn Newton-Smith =

Australian athlete (born 2000)

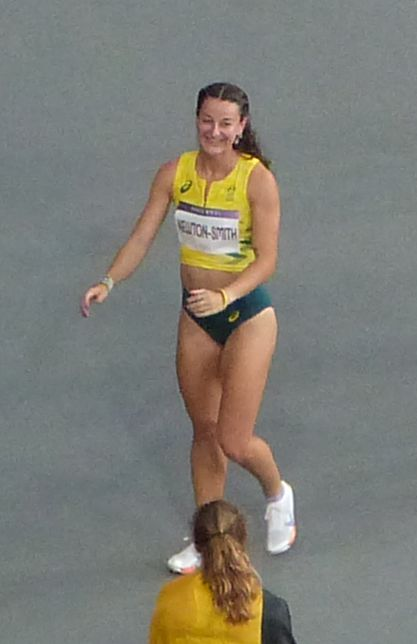
- Newton-Smith in 2024

Personal information
- Nationality: Australian
- Born: 27 April 2000 (age 26) Beaudesert, Queensland, Australia
- Height: 1.71 m (5 ft 7 in)

Sport
- Sport: Athletics
- Events: Heptathlon, Pentathlon, Decathlon

Achievements and titles
- Personal bests: Pentathlon 4356 (Lubbock, 2023); Heptathlon: 6180 (Adelaide, 2024)
Medal record
Women's athletics
Representing Australia
Oceania Championships
Gold medal – first place	2024 Suva	Heptathlon
Decathlon World Championships
Gold medal – first place	2026 Oberlin	Decathlon

Camryn Newton-Smith (born 27 April 2000) is an Australian multi-event athlete. In 2024, she became Australian national champion and Oceania champion in the heptathlon.

== Early life ==
She is from Greenbank, Queensland and attended Arkansas State University where she captured school records in the pentathlon and heptathlon and was a three-time All-American. She was also named the 2023 Sun Belt Outdoor Performer of the Year, and had the distinction of winning four conference championships in four different events; the outdoor heptathlon in 2023, the javelin in 2022, and the indoor pentathlon and indoor 60m hurdles in 2020.

== Career ==
Newton-Smith recovered from missing the 2021 season with an Achilles injury to become the number one ranked college indoors pentathlete in the United States with a personal best score of 4,356 points in Lubbock, Texas in January 2023. She later qualified for the heptathlon at the 2023 NCAA Outdoor Division 1 Championships.

She won the 2024 Australian Athletics Championships in April 2024 with a personal best score of 6180 points in Adelaide. She won gold at the 2024 Oceania Athletics Championships in Suva, Fiji in June 2024 with 6070 points. In July 2024, she was selected for the heptathlon at the 2024 Paris Olympics. She finished 19th with 5982 points.

She was selected for the 2025 World Athletics Indoor Championships in Nanjing in March 2025. In September 2025, she competed at the 2025 World Athletics Championships in Tokyo, Japan, placing sixteenth.

On 10 April, she scored 5887 points in heptathlon at the 2026 Australian Championships, placing third overall behind Mia Scerri and Tori West.
