= Roséva Bidois =

French heptathlete (born 2000)

Personal information
- Born: 11 July 2000 (age 26)

Sport
- Country: France
- Sport: Athletics
- Events: Discus throw Heptathlon; Decathlon
Medal record
Women's athletics
Representing France
Decathlon World Championships
Silver medal – second place	2024 Geneva	Decathlon

Roséva Bidois (born 11 July 2000) is a French heptathlete and decathlete. She was a national discus throw champion at the 2022 French Winter Throwing Championships before transitioning to the women's decathlon, when she won the silver medal at the 2024 Women's Decathlon World Championships and placed 4th at the 2025 championships.

== Career ==
Bidois is part of ASUL Bron Athlétisme in Bron, Metropolis of Lyon, a section of the Entente Sud lyonnais (ESL) athletics club.

=== Throwing events ===
She began her career as a shot putter, taking part in U18 domestic competitions in 2016 and placing 4th at the 2017 French U18 indoor and outdoor championships in the event. She was 7th and 8th in the 2018 French U20 indoor and outdoor championships respectively.

In 2019, Bidois finished runner-up in the U20 discus throw at the French Winter Throwing Championships. She also improved to runner-up at the 2019 French U20 Championships in the shot put. Her performances earned her a first selection to represent France internationally, which she did in a match against Italy.

Bidois was 5th in the U23 discus throw at the 2020 French Winter Throwing Championships. She competed in her first senior national final at the 2020 French Athletics Championships, finishing 12th in the discus.

The following year, she was 8th in the senior discus Winter Throwing Championships and runner-up in the discus at the 2021 French U23 Championships.

=== Combined events ===
Bidois recorded her first combined track and field events in 2022. At championships, she won the discus and finished 5th in the shot put at the 2022 French Winter Throwing Championships, and then finished runner-up in the discus and shot put at the 2022 French U23 Championships.

At the 2023 French Winter Throwing Championships, Bidois finished 6th in the shot put and 7th in the discus. She was 3rd in the discus at the French University Championships before competing in the 2023 French Athletics Championships, where she was 5th and 10th in the shot put and discus respectively. Bidois was 9th in the heptathlon at that year's French Combined Events Championships.

Bidois was 10th in the shot put at the 2024 French Indoor Athletics Championships, and then won her first senior national title in the pentathlon at the 2024 French Indoor Combined Events Championships. At the outdoor Combined Events Championships, Bidois was 8th in the heptathlon, followed by placing 10th in the shot put and 8th in the discus at the 2024 French Athletics Championships.

=== Decathlon ===
Bidois wanted to compete in the decathlon in part because her primary event (the discus throw) was not a part of the seven-event heptathlon most commonly contested by women. Though Bidois had competed in a domestic decathlon in 2023 (where she was 3rd and the top French finisher), Bidois recorded her first women's decathlon national championships in July 2024, placing 3rd at the French Women's Decathlon Championships in 6,918 points. In the competition, she won the discus throw and shot put and placed 2nd in the long jump.

Bidois entered in the inaugural 2024 Women's Decathlon World Championships. She again won the shot put and discus and placed second to eventual winner Allison Halverson in the long jump. Her final score of 6,962 points won the silver medal.

In 2025, Bidois was 4th in the discus at the French Winter Throwing Championships and 7th in the same event at the 2025 French Athletics Championships. She was 5th in the pentathlon at the French Indoor Combined Events Championships and 10th at the 2025 French Indoor Athletics Championships in that event.

Bidois was 4th at the 2025 X-Athletics World Athletics Combined Events Tour meeting in the heptathon. She returned to the 2025 Women's Decathlon World Championships as a favorite, given that defending champion Allison Halverson wasn't competing. Bidois led the field in the shot put and discus throw but placed 4th overall despite setting a decathlon personal best of 7,227 points.

== Personal life ==
Bidois is from Lyon, France, where she grew up on a farm as the youngest of seven siblings. She competed in basketball for seven years before transitioning to athletics.

Bidois studies sport sciences. She is coached by Yann Celli. Bidois was a member of the Union Pour l'Athlétisme à Château-Gontier (UPAC) club from Château-Gontier, France, during her early career.
