= Women's Decathlon World Championships =

International combined events women's athletics competition

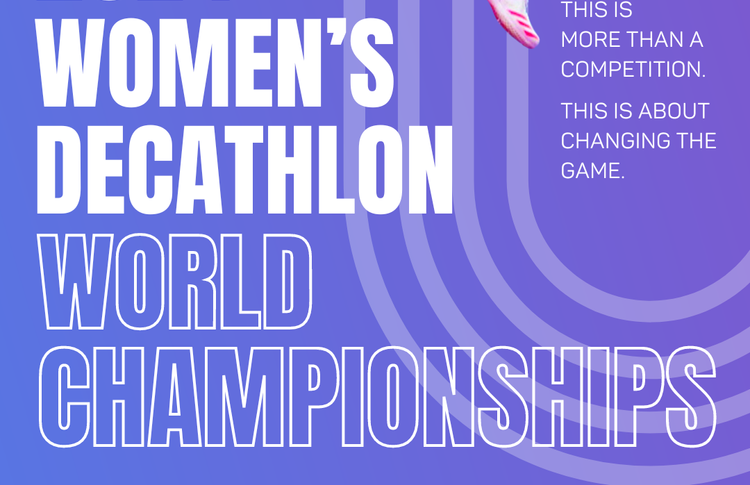
- Poster for the inaugural event
- Status: Active
- Genre: World championships Decathlon (Athletics)
- Date: July
- Inaugurated: 2024
- Founder: Lauren Kuntz
- Next event: 2027
- Organiser: World's Greatest Athlete, Inc.
- Website: www.womens-decathlon.com

The Women's Decathlon World Championships is an international decathlon combined track and field events championship for women. It was the first women's world championships in the discipline. The inaugural edition was staged at the Olympic training center in Geneva, Ohio at the same time as the 2024 Summer Olympics as a protest against the International Olympic Committee.

== History ==
The men's decathlon has been contested at the Summer Olympics since 1912, consisting of the 100 metres, long jump, shot put, high jump, 400 metres, discus throw, 110 metres hurdles, pole vault, javelin throw, and 1500 metres. Women were not included in athletics at the Olympics until 1928, and an equivalent combined track and field event for women was not added until the seven-event heptathlon was staged at the 1984 Games. After the elimination of the men's 50 kilometres race walk, the 2024 Paris Olympics were the first Games to host an equal number of men's and women's events, with only minor differences in most disciplines. This made the combined event the discipline with the largest difference between men's and women's athletics.

Historically, several women's decathlon national championships have been held. In the United States, national championships were first held for several years preceding the '84 Games, and were then revitalized in 2018. The French Athletics Federation has also hosted annual women's decathlon championships in 2024.

The first edition was organized by Lauren Kuntz and held in conjunction with the 2024 Ico For All championships. It was "primarily funded" by women's clothing company Oiselle.

Allison Halverson of Armenia was the first world champion, with Roseva Bidois of France and American Jordyn Bruce winning the silver and bronze medals. Halverson's 100 metres time of 11.92 seconds was a world decathlon best.

== Editions ==
Women's Decathlon World Championships editions
Ed.	Date	Venue	Athletes	Nations	R
1st	3–4 August 2024	Geneva, Ohio	29	12	
2nd	16–17 August 2025	Geneva, Ohio	19	5	
3rd	8–9 August 2026	Oberlin, Ohio	26	7	

== Winners ==
Women's Decathlon World Championships winners
Ed.	Winner	Score	Winning marks										R
Ed.	Winner	Score	100 m	400 m	1500 m	100 m hurdles	Long jump	High jump	Pole vault	Shot put	Discus throw	Javelin throw	R
1st	Allison Halverson (ARM)	7236 pts	11.92 (+1.4 m/s) WDB	55.86	5:18.08	13.87 (+2.0 m/s) NR	5.88 m (±0.0 m/s)	1.64 m	2.73 m NR	11.94 m	24.47 m	37.13 m	
2nd	Nikki Boon (NED)	7451 pts	12.23 (+0.5 m/s)	57.06	5:17.70	14.81 (±0.0 m/s)	5.91 m (+0.7 m/s)	1.57 m	3.00 m	12.72 m	41.11 m	40.14 m	
3rd	Camryn Newton-Smith (AUS)	7900 pts	11.83 (NWI)	55.41	5:48.49	13.61 (NWI)	6.17 m (+0.2 m/s)	1.75 m	3.50 m	12.86 m	34.22 m	37.15 m	

== Medallists ==
Games	Gold		Silver		Bronze	
2024 Geneva	Allison Halverson; Armenia	7236 pts	Roseva Bidois; France	6962 pts	Jordyn Bruce; United States	6723 pts
2025 Geneva	Nikki Boon; Netherlands	7451 pts	Katie Straus; United States	7301 pts	Jordyn Bruce; United States	7272 pts
2026 Oberlin	Camryn Newton-Smith; Australia	7900 pts	Noémie Desailly; France	7805 pts	Nikki Boon; Netherlands	7714 pts
