= Jordan Gray (heptathlete) =

American athlete (born 1995)

Personal information
- Nationality: United States
- Born: December 28, 1995 (age 30)

Sport
- Sport: Athletics
- Event: Heptathlon

Achievements and titles
- Personal bests: Heptathlon 5903 (Des Moines, 2019); Decathlon 8246 (San Mateo, 2021) NR
Medal record
Women's athletics
Representing United States
Pan American Games
Bronze medal – third place	2023 Santiago	Heptathlon

Jordan Gray (born December 28, 1995) is an American track and field athlete. She won the bronze medal in the heptathlon at the 2023 Pan American Games. She is the American national record holder in the decathlon.

== Early and personal life ==
The daughter of Jackie and Jeff Gray, Gray was brought up in Ball Ground, Georgia. Along with competing in athletics, she has a black belt in taekwondo, has worked as a professional photographer, and plays the ukulele. Gray is a Christian. She attended Kennesaw State University.

== Career ==
In June 2019, Gray set a new American national record of 7,921 points for the decathlon at the National Women's Decathlon Championships at College of San Mateo, California. That month she secured seventh place in the NCAA Outdoor Championships in the heptathlon with a tally of 5846 points. In July 2019, she set a new heptathlon PB, scoring 5903 at the 2019 USA Outdoor Track and Field Championships in Des Moines, Iowa. Later that year, she represented America and competed abroad for the first time, at the Thorpe Cup.

In August 2021, she raised her decathlon national record to 8,246 points competing in at the College of San Mateo. It placed her third on the world all-time list behind only Austra Skujytė of Lithuania and Marie Collonvillé of France, and was the best score recorded since 2006. In response to the lack of opportunities for women to compete in the decathlon she launched a campaign called “Let Women Decathlon.”

Gray won the bronze medal in the heptathlon at the 2023 Pan American Games in Santiago, Chile in November 2023.

In 2024, Gray organized the inaugural Women's Decathlon World Championships in Geneva, Ohio.
