= Allison Halverson =

Armenian heptathlete (born 1992)

Personal information
- Born: Allison Reaser; 9 September 1992 (age 33)

Sport
- Country: United States (until February 2020); Armenia
- Sport: Athletics
- Event(s): Heptathlon; Decathlon
Medal record
Women's athletics
Representing the United States
Pan American Combined Events Cup
Silver medal – second place	2016 Ottawa	Heptathlon
Representing Armenia
Decathlon World Championships
Gold medal – first place	2024 Geneva	Decathlon

Allison Halverson (née Reaser, Armenian: Ալիսոն Հալվերսոն; born 9 September 1992) is an Armenian-American heptathlete and decathlete. She was the 2014 NCAA Division I Outdoor Track and Field Championships heptathlon runner-up for the San Diego State Aztecs track and field team, and she was the inaugural world decathlon champion in 2024.

== Career ==
=== United States ===
Halverson attended El Segundo High School in El Segundo, California. She was ranked the number five women's high school heptathlete in the United States. Halverson won the 2010 AAU Junior Olympic Games heptathlon before enrolling at San Diego State University.

Competing for the San Diego State Aztecs track and field team under coach Shelia Burrell, Halverson was 18th in the heptathlon at the 2011 NCAA Division I Outdoor Track and Field Championships. She won the 2011 USATF U20 Championships and was 4th at the 2011 Pan American U20 Athletics Championships in the heptathlon.

Halverson improved to 6th at the 2012 NCAA Division I Outdoor Track and Field Championships. She continued her season at the 2012 United States Olympic trials, where she was 15th in the heptathlon and did not make the 2012 U.S. Olympic team. The following year, she was 8th at the 2013 NCAA Division I Outdoor Track and Field Championships and 14th at the 2013 USA Outdoor Track and Field Championships.

In 2014, Halverson competed in her first indoor NCAA athletics pentathlon, finishing 15th at the 2014 NCAA Division I Indoor Track and Field Championships. She achieved a career-best runner-up heptathlon finish at the 2014 NCAA Division I Outdoor Track and Field Championships before placing 7th at the 2014 USA Outdoor Track and Field Championships. She was 9th at the 2014 Thorpe Cup.

Halverson entered the pentathlon at the 2015 USA Indoor Track and Field Championships, but did not finish. She was 15th in the heptathlon at the 2015 USA Outdoor Track and Field Championships.

At the 2016 Pan American Combined Events Cup, Halverson won the silver medal behind fellow American Quintunya Chapman. She was then 11th at the 2016 United States Olympic trials and 4th at the Thorpe Cup after failing to make the U.S. Olympic team again.

Halverson improved to a 6th-place pentathlon finish at the 2017 USA Indoor Track and Field Championships. She was 11th at the Multistars meet and 6th at the 2017 USA Outdoor Track and Field Championships before finishing runner-up at that year's Thorpe Cup.

Halverson was again 6th at the 2018 USA Indoor Track and Field Championships. Outdoors, she was 11th at the Hypo-Meeting before the 2018 USA Outdoor Track and Field Championships. At the national championships, she was 4th, but was later promoted to 3rd after runner-up Alex Gochenour was disqualified due to an anti-doping rule violation. She ended her season 3rd at the Thorpe Cup and 12th at the Décastar meeting.

At the 2019 USA Indoor Track and Field Championships, Halverson finished 9th in the pentathlon. She was 4th at Multistars, 21st at the Hypo-Meeting, and 13th at the 2019 USA Outdoor Track and Field Championships. Halverson qualified according to USA Track & Field (USATF) rules to represent the United States at the 2019 Pan American Games, but USATF selected a different team of athletes to send, leading to a lawsuit.

=== Armenia ===
Halverson applied for an Armenian passport during the 2020 season in part to improve her chances of competing in the 2020 Summer Olympics. The World Athletics Nationality Review Panel stated that despite earning Armenian citizenship she could not represent the country in athletics championships until 2023, surprising Armenian officials.

Nonetheless, she set the country's national records in the 100 metres hurdles and heptathlon in 2021. She was 13th at the 2021 Texas Relays and 14th at the Multistars meeting. Following difficulties traveling to the Meeting Arona Pruebas Combinadas, a foot injury sustained at the Mt. SAC Relays, and not being selected to compete at the 2020 Games, Halverson said that her Multistars 5,424-point national record heptathlon was "likely her last".

In 2022, Halverson competed in throwing events. She represented Armenia at the 2023 European Athletics Team Championships Third Division, placing 6th in the 400 metres hurdles and 7th in the shot put and javelin throw. Halverson also anchored the Armenian mixed 4 × 400 metres relay to a 5th-place overall finish.

Halverson competed in the 100 metres, 200 metres, and 400 metres at the 2024 Armenian Athletics Championship. She placed 3rd in the 100 m, 2nd in the 200 m, and won the 400 m in a national record time of 53.37 seconds.

On 26 June 2024, Halverson was announced by the Armenian Athletic Federation to have qualified to compete in the 100 metres at the 2024 Summer Olympics. However, the federation ended up sending Yervand Mkrtchyan in her place.

Halverson lost six pounds of weight while stressed about whether she would compete in the Paris Olympics. She saw promotion for the Women's Decathlon World Championships and decided to enter following the news that she was left off the Olympic team again. She had to learn two new events, the discus throw and pole vault, in only three weeks before the competition.

In the first event at the World Championships, Halverson set a world decathlon best, running 11.92 to also set a personal best and lead the competition. One strategy she employed was to take a cold shower during the half-hour break between events. She was in a good position after the first day's events, but woke up on the second day feeling sick and dehydrated. She nevertheless set Armenian records in the 100 m hurdles and pole vault to maintain her lead.

She won the gold medal, saying after, "It ended up like I'm OK with not being an Olympian. My name's in history now and I can actually have a legacy, and I really believe women should have decathlon — after doing one. Like we can do it".

== Personal life ==
Halverson is left-handed. Her Armenian ancestry comes from her mother Adrienne Stepanian; her grandfather dressed as a girl to survive the Armenian genocide and migrated to America as a child following World War I. She has a twin sister Amy, who competed alongside her on the San Diego State track and field team. While at San Diego State, Halverson studied kinesiology. In April 2022, she gave birth to a son and required a blood transfusion due to hemorrhaging and fainting.

Halverson lived in Mission Valley, San Diego until October 2020, when she moved to Austin, Texas. She is married to businessman Nic Halverson, and began competing under the name Allison Halverson in 2019. As part of her appeal to be allowed a transfer of allegiance to Armenia, Halverson said she wanted to start a family and could not wait the three-year maximum application period due to fears of birth defects from a higher maternal age.
