= Robert Goldman =

Robert Goldman may refer to:

- Robert Goldman (songwriter) (born 1953), French songwriter
- Bo Goldman (1932–2023), real name Robert Goldman, American screenwriter
- Bobby Goldman (1938–1999), American bridge player
- Robert Goldman (inventor) (born 1959), American inventor
- Robert M. Goldman, American physician, and sports and physical culture advocate
- Robert D. Goldman (born 1939), American biologist, past president of the American Society for Cell Biology
- Robert P. Goldman, American scholar of Sanskrit
- Bob Goldman, sports medicine practitioner, osteopath and publicist: Goldman's dilemma was named after him
- USCGC Robert Goldman, a Sentinel-class cutter for the United States Coast Guard
