= Track and field =

Sports based on running, jumping or throwing

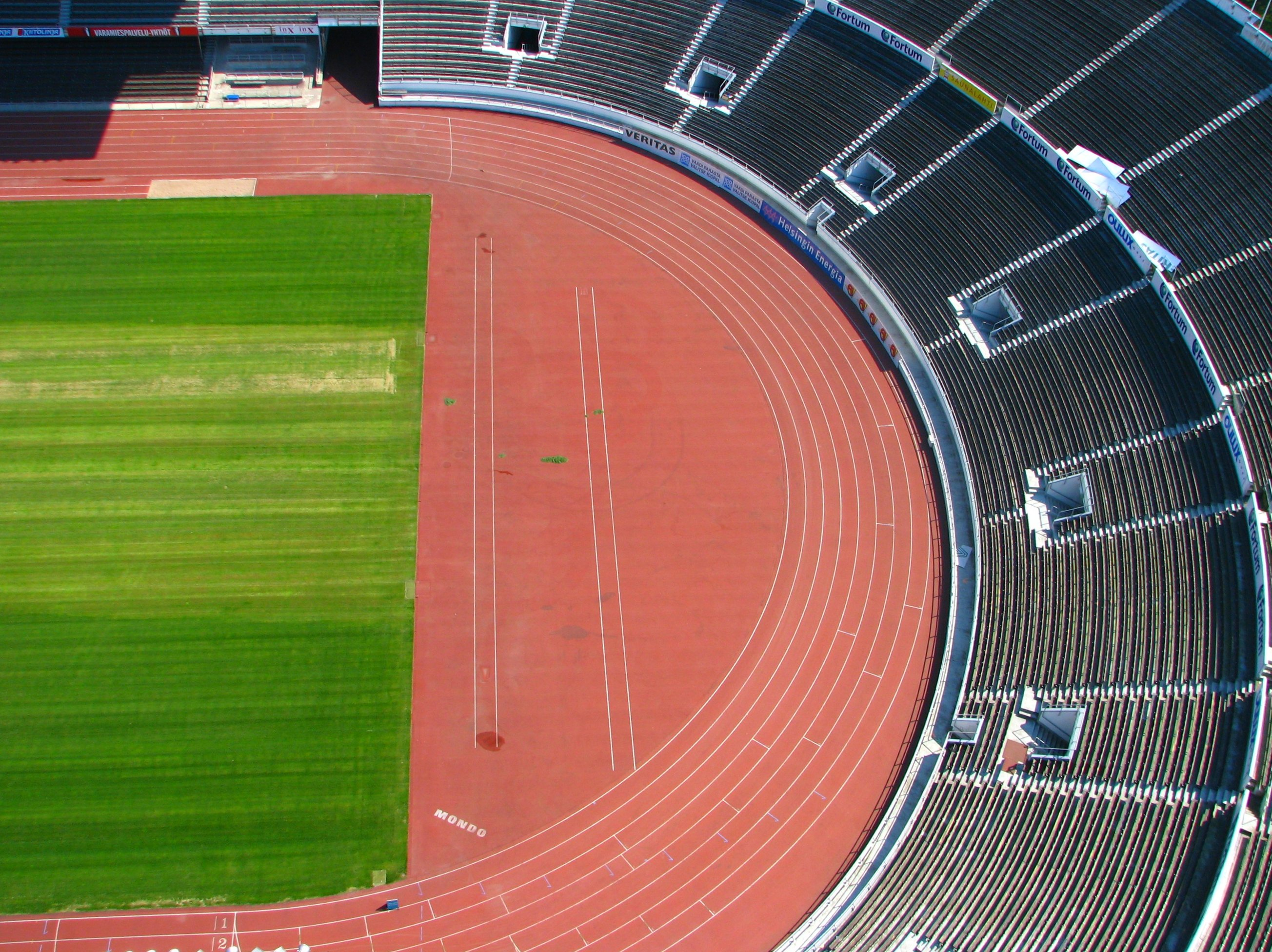
- Part of a track and field stadium

Characteristics
- Team members: Yes
- Mixed-sex: Yes
- Type: Sport

Presence
- Olympic: Yes

Track and field is a sport that includes many different kinds of athletic contests that are based on running, jumping, and throwing. The name used in North America is derived from where the sport takes place, an oval track and a grass field for the throwing and a variety of jumping events. Track and field is categorized under the umbrella sport of athletics, which also includes road running, cross country running and race walking. Though the sense of "athletics" as a broader sport is not used in American English, outside of the United States, the term athletics can either be used to mean just its track and field component or the entirety of the sport (adding road racing and cross country) based on context.

Events ran on the track include, sprints, middle- and long-distance events, race walking, and hurdling, are won by the competitor who completes the event fastest. The jumping and throwing events are won by those who achieve the greatest distance or height. Regular jumping events include the long jump, triple jump, high jump, and pole vault, while the most common throwing events are shot put, javelin, discus, and hammer. There are also "combined events" or "multi events", such as the pentathlon consisting of five events, heptathlon consisting of seven events, and decathlon consisting of ten events. In these, athletes participate in a combination of track and field events. Most track and field events are individual sports with a single victor; the most prominent team events are relay races, which consist of teams of four. Events are almost exclusively divided by gender, although both the men's and women's competitions are usually held at the same venue. One exception is mixed relays, in which two men and two women make up the four-person team. If a race has too many people to run all at once, preliminary heats will be run to narrow down the field of participants.

Track and field is one of the oldest sports. In ancient times, it was an event held in conjunction with festivals and sports meets such as the ancient Olympic Games in Greece. In modern times, the two most prestigious international track and field competitions are the athletics competition at the Olympic Games and the World Athletics Championships. World Athletics, formerly known as the International Association of Athletics Federations (IAAF), is the international governing body for the sport of athletics.

Records are kept of the best performances in specific events, at world, continental, and national levels. However, if athletes are deemed to have violated the event's rules or regulations, they are disqualified from the competition and their marks are erased.

== History ==
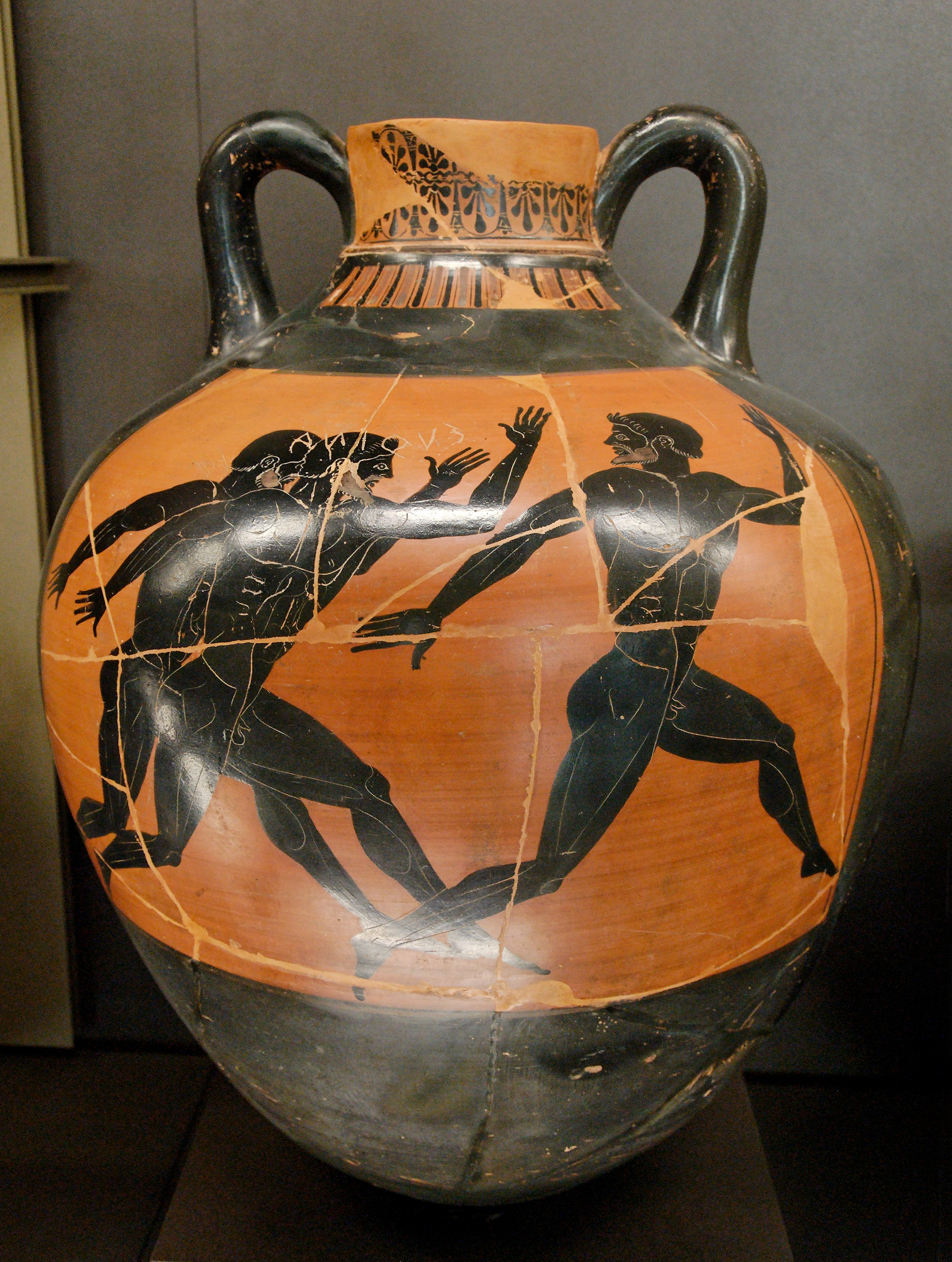
An ancient Greece vase from 600 BC depicting a running contest

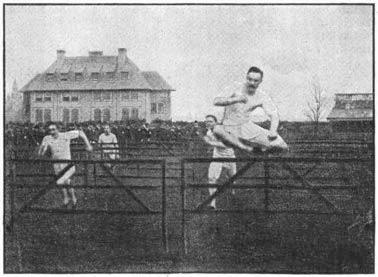
An early model of hurdling at the Detroit Athletic Club in 1888

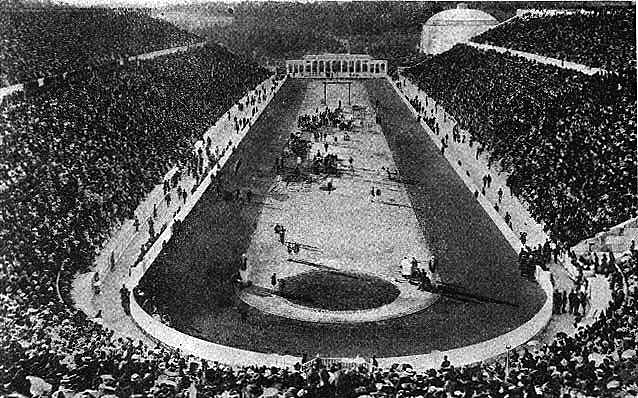
Panathenaic Stadium in Athens, one of the first modern track and field stadiums

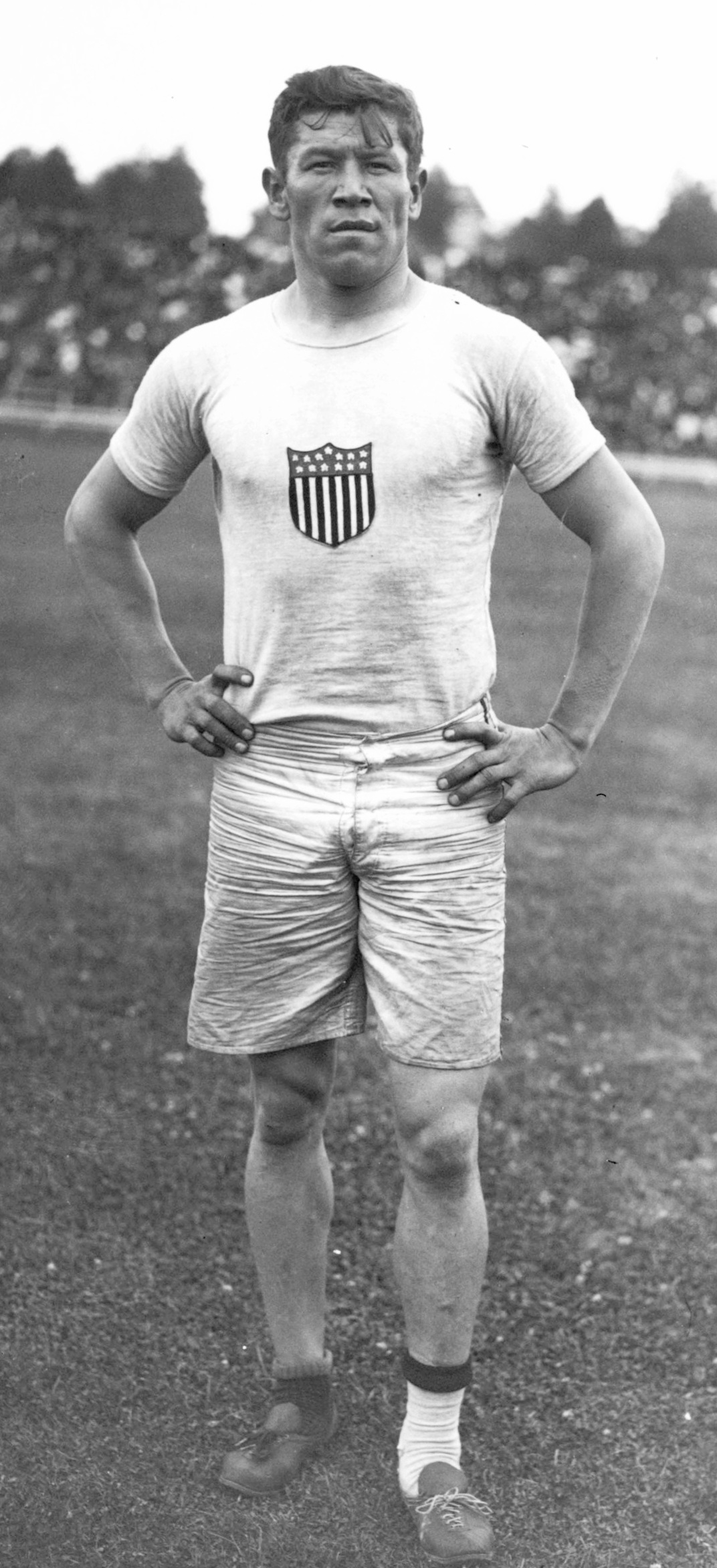
American athlete Jim Thorpe lost his Olympic medals after taking expense money prior to the 1912 Summer Olympics for playing baseball, a violation of Olympic amateurism rules.

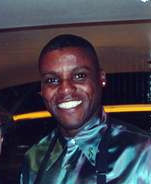
Carl Lewis, one of the athletes who helped increase track and field's profile

The sport of track and field has prehistoric roots, being among the oldest of sporting competitions, as running, jumping and throwing are natural and universal human physical expressions. The first recorded examples of organized track and field events are the Ancient Olympic games, which included further running competitions, but the introduction of the Ancient Olympic pentathlon marked a step towards track and field as it is recognized today—it comprised a five-event competition of the long jump, javelin throw, discus throw, stadion footrace, and wrestling.

Track and field events were also present at the Panhellenic Games in Greece around this period, and they later spread to Rome in Italy around 201 BC. In the Middle Ages, new track and field events began developing in parts of Northern Europe. The stone put and weight throw competitions popular among Celtic societies in Ireland and Scotland were precursors to the modern shot put and hammer throw events. One of the last track and field events to develop was the pole vault, which stemmed from competitions such as fierljeppen in the North European Lowlands in the 18th century.

Discrete track and field competitions, separate from general sporting festivals, were first recorded in the 19th century. These were typically organized among rival educational institutions, military organisations and sports clubs. Influenced by a Classics-rich curriculum, competitions in the English public schools were conceived as human equivalents of horse racing, fox hunting and hare coursing. The Royal Shrewsbury School Hunt (RSSH) is the oldest running club in the world, with written records going back to 1831 and evidence that it was established by 1819. The school organized Paper Chase races in which runners followed a trail of paper shreds left by two "foxes"; even today RSSH runners are called "hounds" and a race victory is a "kill". The first definite record of Shrewsbury's cross-country Annual Steeplechase is in 1834, making it the oldest running race of the modern era. The school also lays claim to the oldest track and field meeting still extant, the Second Spring Meeting first documented in 1840. This featured a series of throwing and jumping events with mock horse races including the Derby Stakes, the Hurdle Race and the Trial Stakes. Runners were entered by "owners" and named as though they were horses. 13 miles (21 km) away and a decade later, the first Wenlock Olympian Games were held at Much Wenlock racecourse in 1851. It included a "half-mile foot race" (805 m) and a "leaping in distance" competition.

The first modern athletics clubs in the world were founded at the University of Cambridge in 1857, and the University of Oxford in 1860; the two universities began an annual varsity match in 1864. The London Athletic Club became the first independent athletic club in 1863. The first modern-style indoor athletics meetings were recorded shortly after in the 1860s, including a meet at Ashburnham Hall in London which featured four running events and a triple jump competition.

In 1865, Dr William Penny Brookes of Wenlock helped set up the National Olympian Association, which held their first Olympian Games in 1866 at the Crystal Palace in London. This national event was a great success, attracting a crowd of over ten thousand people. In response, the Amateur Athletic Club was formed that same year and held a championship for "gentlemen amateurs" in an attempt to reclaim the sport for the educated elite. Ultimately the "allcomers" ethos of the NOA won through and in 1880 the AAC was reconstituted as the Amateur Athletic Association, the first national body for the sport of athletics. The AAA Championships, the de facto British national championships despite being for England only, have been held annually since July 1880 with breaks only during two world wars and 2006–2008. The AAA was effectively a global governing body in the early years of the sport, helping to codify its rules.

Meanwhile, the New York Athletic Club in 1876 began holding an annual national competition, the USA Outdoor Track and Field Championships. The establishment of general sports governing bodies for the United States (the Amateur Athletic Union in 1888) and France (the Union des sociétés françaises de sports athlétiques in 1889) put the sport on a formal footing and made international competitions possible.

The revival of the Olympic Games at the end of the 19th century marked a new high for track and field. The Olympic athletics programme, comprising track and field events plus a marathon, contained many of the foremost sporting competitions of the 1896 Summer Olympics. The Olympics also consolidated the use of metric measurements in international track and field events, both for race distances and for measuring jumps and throws. The Olympic athletics programme greatly expanded over the next decades, and track and field remained among its most prominent contests. The Olympics was the elite competition for track and field, only open to amateur sportsmen. Track and field continued to be a largely amateur sport, as this rule was strictly enforced: Jim Thorpe was stripped of his track and field medals from the 1912 Olympics after it was revealed that he had taken expense money for playing baseball, violating Olympic amateurism rules. His medals were reinstated 29 years after his death.

That same year, the International Amateur Athletic Federation (IAAF) was established as the international governing body for track and field, and it enshrined amateurism as a founding principle for the sport. The National Collegiate Athletic Association held their first Men's Outdoor Track and Field Championship in 1921, making it one of the most prestigious competitions for students. In 1923 track and field featured at the inaugural World Student Games. The first continental track and field competition was the 1919 South American Championships, followed by the European Athletics Championships in 1934.

Until the early 1920s, track and field was almost an exclusively male pursuit. Many colleges that did offer women's physical education required women to participate in walking events. At the time, walking was considered more appropriate for women than running or jumping disciplines. In the late 1800s it was still incredibly rare to find women in the gym, as this was considered a masculine activity. On 9 November 1895, the first women's track meet in the United States was held and it was called "a field day". Alice Milliat argued for the inclusion of women at the Olympics, but the International Olympic Committee refused. She founded the International Women's Sports Federation in 1921 and, alongside a growing women's sports movement in Europe and North America, the group initiated of the Women's Olympiad, held annually from 1921 to 1923. In cooperation with the English Women's Amateur Athletic Association (WAAA), the Women's World Games was held four times between 1922 and 1934, as well as a Women's International and British Games in London in 1924. These efforts ultimately led to the introduction of five track and field events for women in the athletics at the 1928 Summer Olympics. National women's events were established in this period, with 1923 seeing the First British Track & Field championships for women and the Amateur Athletic Union (AAU) sponsoring the first American Track & Field championships for women. In China, women's track and field events were being held in the 1920s, but were subject to criticism and disrespect from audiences. Physical education advocate Zhang Ruizhen called for greater equality and participation of women in Chinese track and field. The rise of Kinue Hitomi and her 1928 Olympic medal for Japan signified the growth of women's track and field in East Asia. More women's events were gradually introduced, though it was only towards the end of the century that the athletics programmes approached gender parity. Marking an increasingly inclusive approach to the sport, major track and field competitions for disabled athletes were first introduced at the 1960 Summer Paralympics.

With the rise of numerous regional championships, and the growth in Olympic-style multi-sport events (such as the Commonwealth Games and Pan-American Games), competitions between international track and field athletes became widespread. From the 1960s onward, the sport gained exposure and commercial appeal through television coverage and the increasing wealth of nations. After over half a century of amateurism, in the late 1970s the amateur status of the sport began to be displaced by professionalism. As a result, the Amateur Athletic Union was dissolved in the US and replaced with a non-amateur body focused on the sport of athletics: The Athletics Congress (later USA Track and Field). The IAAF abandoned amateurism in 1982 and later rebranded itself as the International Association of Athletics Federations. While Western countries were limited to amateurs until the 1980s, the Soviet Bloc always fielded state-funded athletes who trained full-time, putting American and Western European athletes at a significant disadvantage. 1983 saw the establishment of the IAAF World Championships in Athletics, becoming, with the Olympics, one of track and field's most prestigious competitions.

The profile of the sport reached an apogee in the 1980s, with a number of athletes becoming household names, like Carl Lewis, Sergey Bubka, Sebastian Coe, Zola Budd and Florence Griffith Joyner. Many world records were broken then, and the added political element between competitors of the United States, East Germany, and the Soviet Union, during the Cold War, only served to stoke the sport's popularity. The rising commerciality of track and field was also met with developments in sports science, and there were transformations in coaching methods, athlete's diets, training facilities, and sports equipment. The use of performance-enhancing drugs also increased. State-sponsored doping in 1970s and 1980s East Germany, China, the Soviet Union, and early 21st century Russia, as well as prominent individual cases such as those of Olympic gold medallists Ben Johnson and Marion Jones, damaged the public image and marketability of the sport.

From the 1990s onward, track and field became increasingly more professional and international, as the IAAF gained over 200 member nations. The IAAF World Championships in Athletics became a fully professional competition with the introduction of prize money in 1997, and in 1998 the IAAF Golden League—an annual series of major track and field meetings in Europe—raised the economic incentive through its US$1 million jackpot. In 2010, the series was replaced by the more lucrative Diamond League, a fourteen-meeting series held in Europe, Asia, North America, and the Middle East—the first-ever worldwide annual series of track and field meetings.

== Events ==
Track and field events are divided into three categories: track events, field events and combined events. The majority of athletes tend to specialize in one event type with the aim of perfecting their performances, although the aim of combined events athletes is to become proficient in a number of disciplines. Track events involve running on a track over specified distances, and—in the case of the hurdling and steeplechase events—surmounting obstacles. There are also relay races in which teams of athletes run and pass on a baton to their team members at the end of a certain distance.

There are two types of field events: jumps and throws. In jumping competitions, athletes are judged on either the length or height of the jumps. The performances of jumping events for distance are measured from a board or marker, and overstepping this mark is judged as a foul. In the jumps for height, an athlete must clear their body over a crossbar without knocking the bar off the supporting standards. The majority of jumping events are unaided, although athletes propel themselves vertically with purpose-built sticks in the pole vault.

The throwing events involve hurling an implement (such as a heavyweight, javelin or discus) from a set point, with athletes being judged on the distance that the object is thrown. Combined events involve the same group of athletes contesting a number of different track and field events. Points are given for their performance in each event and the athlete or team with the highest score at the end of all events is the winner.

The number of professional athletes and the notability of performance among male and female athletes have become much closer in many running events. Women's throwing events, which were added later for female athletes, have also drastically increased in presence and performance.

Official world championship track and field events
Track					Field		Combined events
Sprints	Middle-distance	Long-distance	Hurdles	Relays	Jumps	Throws	Combined events
60 m 100 m 200 m 400 m	800 m 1500 m 3000 m	5000 m 10,000 m	60 m hurdles 100 m hurdles 110 m hurdles 400 m hurdles 3000 m steeplechase	4 × 100 m relay 4 × 400 m relay	Long jump Triple jump High jump Pole vault	Shot put Discus throw Hammer throw Javelin throw	Pentathlon; Heptathlon; Decathlon

- Note: Events in italics are competed at indoor world championships only
- Note: Heptathlon can refer to two different events, each consisting of different disciplines and both recognised by IAAF: the indoor heptathlon for men, and the outdoor heptathlon for women.

== Track ==
=== Sprints ===
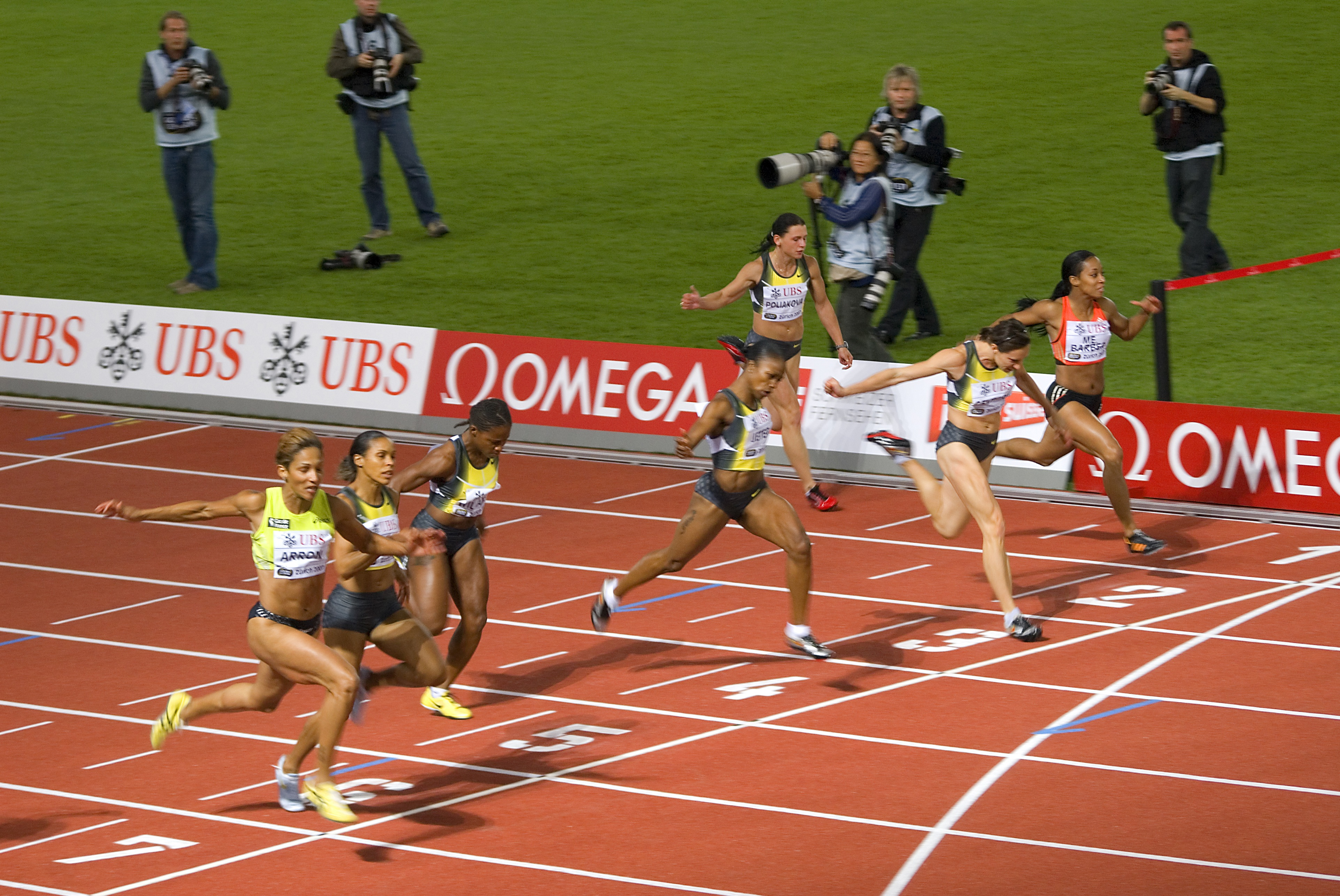
The finish of a women's 100 m race

Races over short distances, or sprints, are among the oldest running competitions. The first 13 editions of the Ancient Olympic Games featured only one event, the stadion race, which was a race from one end of the stadium to the other. Sprinting events are focused on athletes reaching and sustaining their quickest possible running speed. Three sprinting events are currently held at the Olympics and outdoor World Championships: the 100, 200, and 400 metres. These events have their roots in races of imperial measurements that later changed to metric: the 100 metres evolved from the 100-yard dash, the 200 m distances came from the furlong (or 1/8 of a mile), and the 400 m was the successor to the 440 yard dash or quarter-mile race.

At the professional level, sprinters begin the race by assuming a crouching position in the starting blocks before leaning forward and gradually moving into an upright position as the race progresses and momentum is gained. Athletes remain in the same lane on the running track throughout all sprinting events, with the sole exception of the indoor 400 m. Races up to 100 m are largely focused upon acceleration to an athlete's maximum speed. All sprints beyond this distance increasingly incorporate an element of endurance. Human physiology dictates that a runner's near-top speed cannot be maintained for more than thirty seconds or so because lactic acid builds up once leg muscles begin to suffer oxygen deprivation. Top speed can only be maintained for up to 20 metres.

Japanese man Hidekichi Miyazaki was the world's oldest competitive sprinter, sprinting the 100 m race at 105 years old before his death in 2019.

The 60 metres is a common indoor event and indoor world championship event. Less-common events include the 50, 55, 300, and 500 metres, which are run in some high school and collegiate competitions in the United States. The 150 metres, though rarely competed, has a star-studded history: Pietro Mennea set a world best in 1983, Olympic champions Michael Johnson and Donovan Bailey went head-to-head over the distance in 1997, and Usain Bolt improved Mennea's record in 2009.

=== Middle distance ===
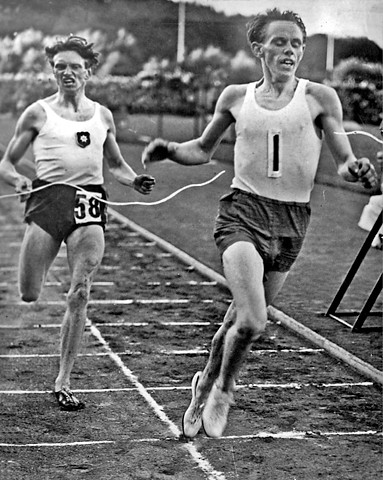
Arne Andersson (left) and Gunder Hägg (right) broke a number of middle-distance world records in the 1940s.

The most common middle-distance track events are the 800 metres, 1500 metres and mile run, although the 3000 metres may also be classified as a middle-distance event. The 880 yard run, or half mile, was the forebear of the 800 m distance and it has its roots in competitions in the United Kingdom in the 1830s. The 1500 m came about as a result of running three laps of a 500 m track, which was commonplace in continental Europe in the 20th century.

Middle-distance events can begin in one of two ways: a staggered start or a waterfall start. In the 800 meter race, athletes begin in individual lanes that are staggered before the turn. Runners must remain in their lanes for the first 100 m before cutting in to run as a pack. This rule was introduced to reduce jostling between runners in the early stages of the race. The 1500 meter and longer events typically use a waterfall start, where runners start the race from a standing position along a curved starting line and then immediately cut in towards the innermost track to follow the quickest route to the finish. Alternatively, two or more lanes are combined into alleys, used by three or more runners at a time. Physiologically, middle-distance events demand that athletes have good aerobic and anaerobic energy producing systems, and also that they have strong endurance.

The 1500 m and mile run events have historically been some of the most prestigious track and field events. Swedish rivals Gunder Hägg and Arne Andersson broke each other's 1500 m and mile world records on a number of occasions in the 1940s. The prominence of the distances were maintained by Roger Bannister, who in 1954 was the first to run the long-elusive four-minute mile, and Jim Ryun's exploits served to popularize interval training. Races between British rivals Sebastian Coe, Steve Ovett and Steve Cram characterized middle-distance running in the 1980s. From the 1990s until the 2010s, North Africans such as Noureddine Morceli of Algeria and Hicham El Guerrouj of Morocco came to dominate the 1500 and mile events. In the 2020s, Western European athletes have returned to the forefront of the distance, with athletes such as Jakob Ingebrigtsen of Norway, Jake Wightman, and Josh Kerr (both British milers) winning global titles.

Beyond the short distances of sprinting events, factors such as an athlete's reactions and top speed becomes less important, while qualities such as pace, tactics and endurance become more so.

=== Long-distance ===
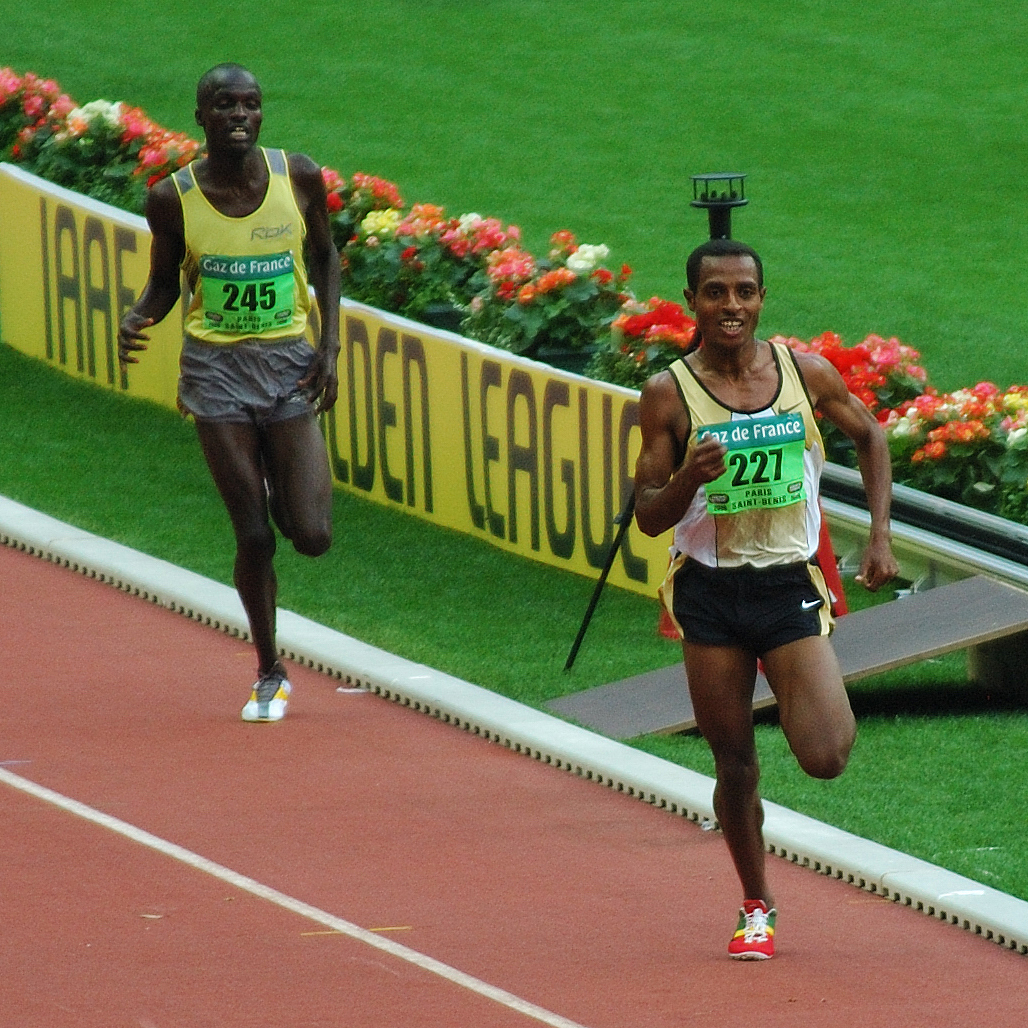
Ethiopian runner Kenenisa Bekele leading in a long-distance track event

There are three common long-distance running events in track and field competitions: 3000, 5000, and 10,000 metres. The latter two races are both Olympic and World Championship events outdoors, while the 3000 m is held at the IAAF World Indoor Championships. The 5000 m and 10,000 m events have their historical roots in the 3-mile and 6-mile races. The 3000 m was used as a women's long-distance event, entering the World Championship programme in 1983 and Olympic programme in 1984, but this was abandoned in favor of a women's 5000 m event in 1995. Marathons, while long-distance races, are typically run on street courses, and often are run separately from other track and field events.

In terms of competition rules and physical demands, long-distance track races have much in common with middle-distance races, except that pacing, stamina, and tactics become much greater factors in performances. A number of athletes have achieved success in both middle- and long-distance events, including Saïd Aouita who set world records from 1500 m to 5000 m. The use of pace-setters in long-distance events is very common at the elite level, although they are not present at championship level competitions as all qualified competitors want to win.

Long-distance track events gained popularity in the 1920s by the achievements of the "Flying Finns", such as multiple Olympic champion Paavo Nurmi. The successes of Emil Zátopek in the 1950s promoted intense interval training methods, but Ron Clarke's record-breaking feats established the importance of natural training and even-paced running. The 1990s saw the rise of North and East African runners in long-distance events. Kenyans and Ethiopians, in particular, have since remained dominant in these events.

=== Relay races ===
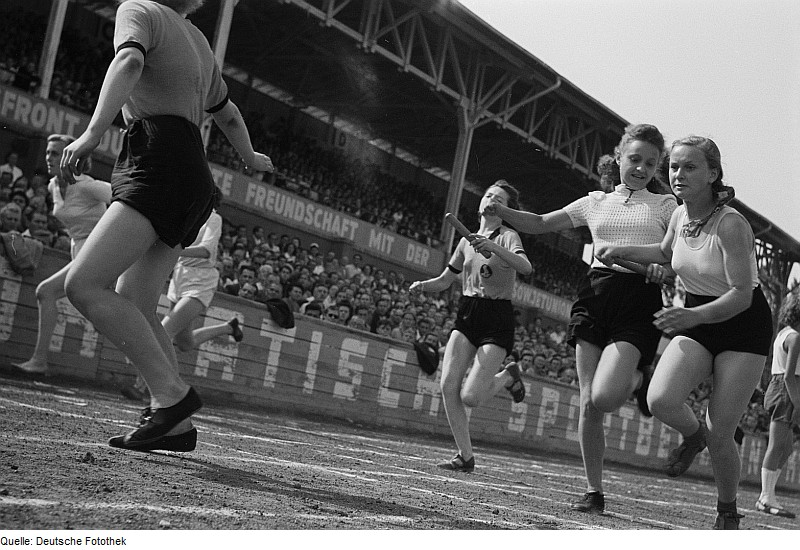
Girls handing over the baton in a relay race in Leipzig in 1950

Relay races are the only track and field event in which a team of runners directly compete against other teams. Typically, a team is made up of four runners of the same sex. Each runner completes their specified distance (referred to as a leg) before handing over a baton to a teammate, who then begins their leg. There is usually a designated area where athletes must exchange the baton. Teams may be disqualified if they fail to complete the change within the area, or if the baton is dropped during the race. A team may also be disqualified if its runners are deemed to have wilfully impeded other competitors.

Relay races emerged in the United States in the 1880s as a variation on charity races between firemen, who would hand a red pennant on to teammates every 300 yards. Two very common relay events are the 4 × 100 metres relay and the 4 × 400 metres relay. Both entered the Olympic programme at the 1912 Summer Games after a one-off men's medley relay featured in 1908 Olympics. The 4 × 100 m event is run strictly within the same lane on the track, meaning that the team collectively runs one complete circuit of the track. Teams in a 4 × 400 m event remain in their own lane until the runner of the second leg passes the first bend, at which point runners can leave their lanes and head towards the inmost part of the circuit. For the second and third baton changeovers, teammates must align themselves in respect of their team position – leading teams take the inner lanes while members of slower teams must await the baton on outer lanes.

In 2017, the IAAF introduced mixed relay events to the World Athletics Relays, in which two men and two women make up the four-person team.

In a shuttle hurdle relay, each of four hurdlers on a team runs the opposite direction from the preceding runner. No batons are used.

The IAAF keeps world records for five different types of track relays. As with 4 × 100 m and 4 × 400 m events, all races comprise teams of four athletes running the same distances, with the less commonly contested distances being the 4 × 200 m, 4 × 800 m and 4 × 1500 m relays. Other events include the distance medley relay (comprising legs of 1200, 400, 800, and 1600 metres), which is frequently held in the United States, and a sprint relay, known as the Swedish medley relay, which is popular in Scandinavia and was held at the IAAF World Youth Championships in Athletics programme. Relay events have significant participation in the United States, where a number of large meetings (or relay carnivals) are focused almost solely on relay events.

=== Hurdling ===
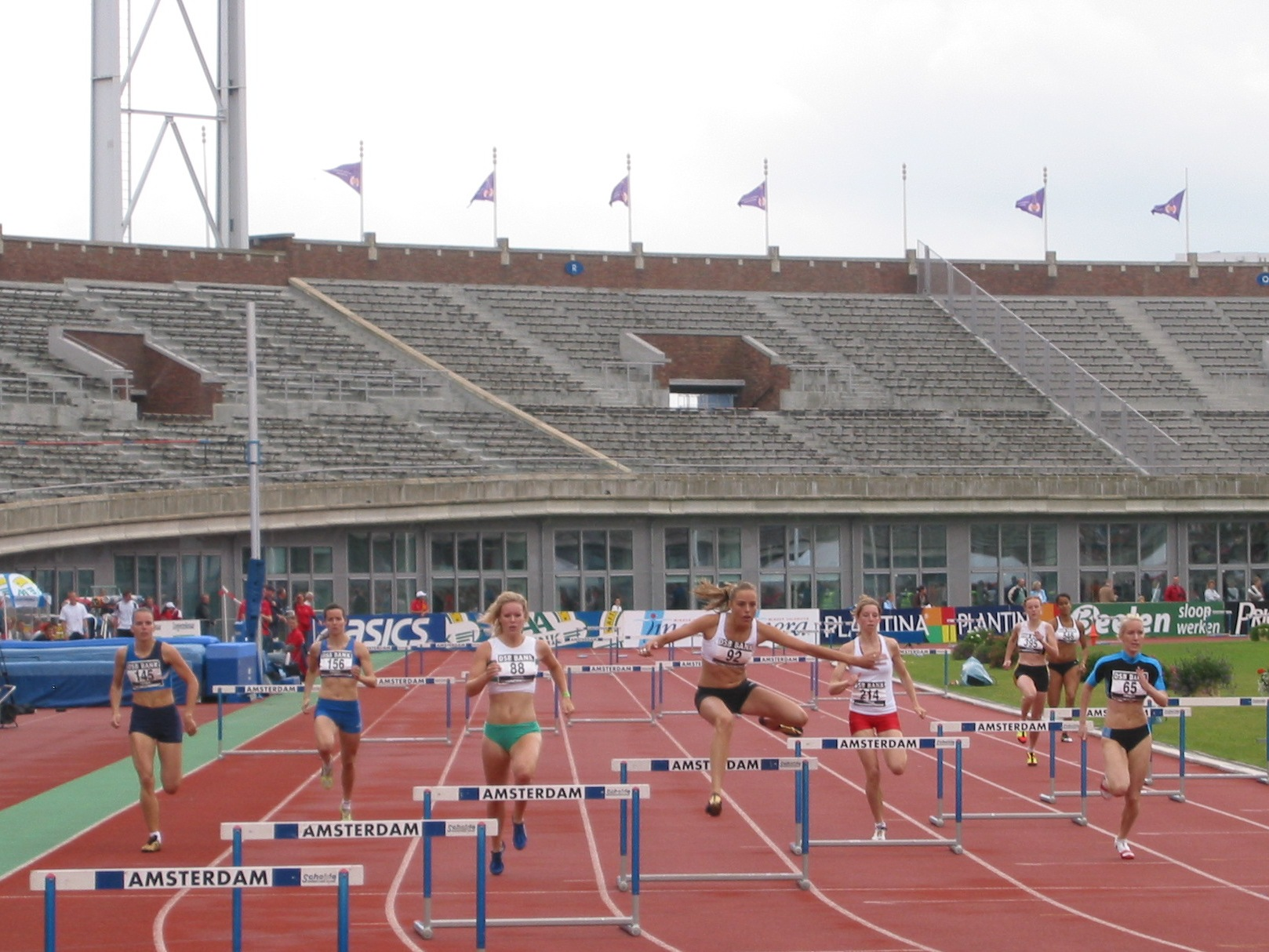
A women's 400 m hurdles race at the 2007 Dutch Championships

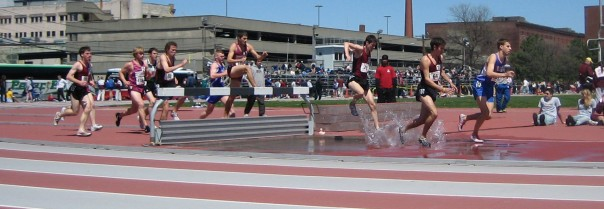
Men traversing the water jump in a steeplechase competition

Races with hurdles as obstacles were first popularized in the 19th century in England. The first known event, held in 1830, was a variation of the 100-yard dash that included heavy wooden barriers as obstacles. A competition between the Oxford and Cambridge Athletic Clubs in 1864 refined this, holding a 120-yard race (110 m) with ten hurdles 3 feet 6 inches (1.07 m) in height (each placed 10 yards (9.1 m) apart), with the first and final hurdles 15 yards from the start and finish, respectively. French organisers adapted the race into metric (adding 28 cm) and the basics of this race, the men's 110 metres hurdles, has changed little. The origin of the 400 metres hurdles also lies in Oxford, where around 1860 a competition was held over 440 yards and twelve 1.06 m high wooden barriers were placed along the course. The modern regulations stem from the 1900 Summer Olympics: the distance was fixed to 400 m while ten 3-foot (91 cm) hurdles were placed 35 m apart on the track, with the first and final hurdles being 45 m and 40 m away from the start and finish, respectively. Women's hurdles are slightly lower at 84 centimetres (2 feet 9 inches) for the 100 m event and 76 centimetres (2 feet 6 inches) for the 400 m event.

The most common events are the 100 metres hurdles for women, 110 m hurdles for men and 400 m hurdles for both sexes. The men's 110 m has been featured at every modern Summer Olympics while the men's 400 m was introduced in the second edition of the Games. Women's initially competed in the 80 metres hurdles event, which entered the Olympic programme in 1932. This was extended to the 100 m hurdles at the 1972 Olympics, but it was not until 1984 that a women's 400 m hurdles event took place at the Olympics (having been introduced at the 1983 World Championships in Athletics the previous year). Other distances and heights of hurdles, such as the 200 metres hurdles and low hurdles, were once common but are now held infrequently. The 300 metres hurdles is run in some levels of American competition.

Outside of the hurdles events, the steeplechase race is the other track and field event with obstacles. Just as the hurdling events, the steeplechase finds its origin in student competition in Oxford, England. However, this event was born as a human variation on the original steeplechase competition found in horse racing. A steeplechase event was held on a track for the 1879 English championships and the 1900 Summer Olympics featured men's 2500 m and 4000 m steeplechase races. The event was held over various distances until the 1920 Summer Olympics marked the rise of the 3000 metres steeplechase as the standard event. The IAAF set the standards of the event in 1954, and the event is held on a 400 m circuit that includes a water jump on each lap. Despite the long history of men's steeplechase in track and field, the women's steeplechase only gained World Championship status in 2005, with its first Olympic appearance in 2008.

== Field ==
=== Jumping ===
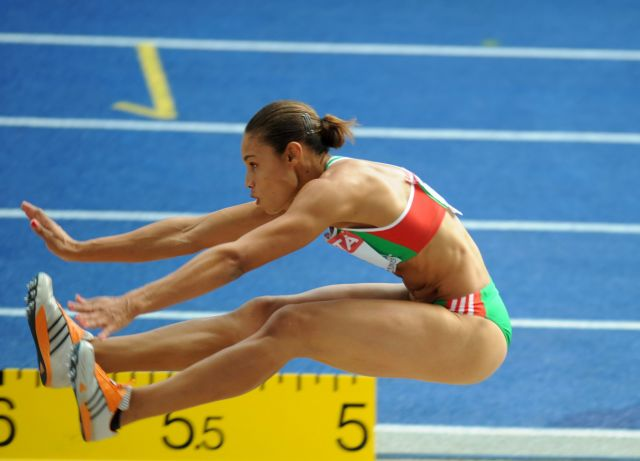
Naide Gomes in the jumping phase of the event

The long jump is one of the oldest track and field events, having its roots as one of the events within the ancient Greek pentathlon contest. The athletes would take a short run up and jump into an area of dug up earth, with the winner being the one who jumped farthest. Small weights (Halteres) were held in each hand during the jump then swung back and dropped near the end to gain extra momentum and distance. The modern long jump, standardised in England and the United States around 1860, bears resemblance to the ancient event although no weights are used. Athletes sprint along a length of track that leads to a jumping board and a sandpit. The athletes must jump before a marked line and their achieved distance is measured from the nearest point of sand disturbed by the athlete's body.

The athletics competition at the first Olympics featured a men's long jump competition and a women's competition was introduced at the 1948 Summer Olympics. Professional long jumpers typically have strong acceleration and sprinting abilities. However, athletes must also have a consistent stride to allow them to take off near the board while still maintaining their maximum speed. In addition to the traditional long jump, a standing long jump contest exists which requires that athletes leap from a static position without a run-up. A men's version of this event featured on the Olympic programme from 1900 to 1912. As of 2024, the men's long jump world record is held by Mike Powell, jumping 8.95 meters in 1991.

==== Triple jump ====
Olga Rypakova performing a triple jump in 2012

Similar to the long jump, the triple jump takes place on a track heading towards a sandpit. Originally, athletes would hop on the same leg twice before jumping into the pit, but this was changed to the current "hop, step and jump" pattern from 1900 onwards. There is some dispute over whether the triple jump was contested in ancient Greece: while some historians claim that a contest of three jumps occurred at Ancient Games, others such as Stephen G. Miller believe this is incorrect, suggesting that the belief stems from a mythologized account of Phayllos of Croton having jumped 55 ancient feet (around 16.3 m). The Book of Leinster, a 12th-century Irish manuscript, records the existence of geal-ruith (triple jump) contests at the Tailteann Games.

The men's triple jump competition has been ever-present at the modern Olympics, but it was not until 1993 that a women's version gained World Championship status and went on to have its first Olympic appearance three years later. The men's standing triple jump event featured at the Olympics in 1900 and 1904, but such competitions have since become very uncommon, although it is still used as a non-competitive exercise drill. The Current world record for the Men's triple jump is 18.29 meters (60 feet 0 inches) held by Jonathan Edwards. The current women's world record is 15.74 meters (51.6 ft)4 3/4in), set by Venezuela's Yulimar Rojas at the 2022 World Athletics Indoor Championships in Belgrade.

==== High jump ====
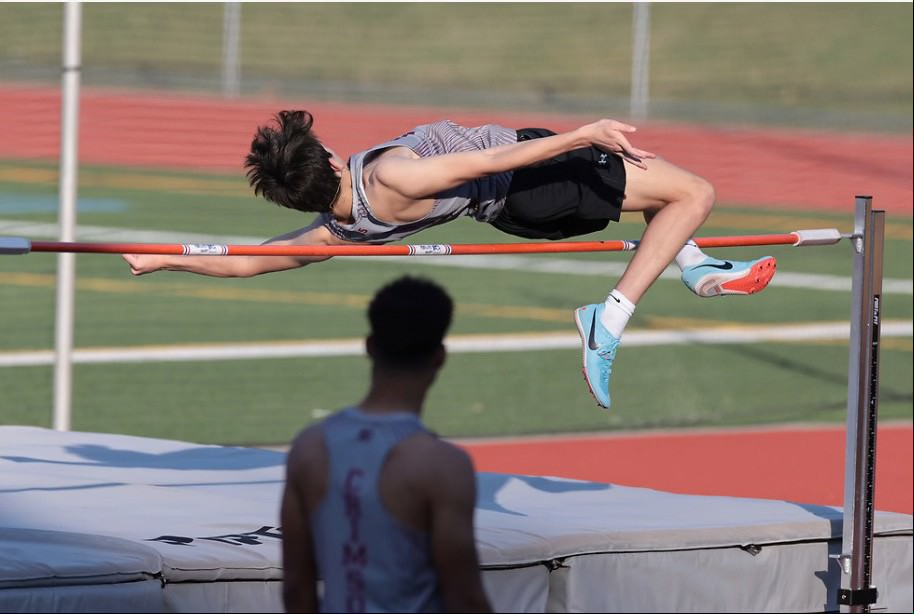
A high school student attempting to high jump while using the Fosbury Flop technique

The first recorded instances of high jumping competitions were in Scotland in the 19th century. Further competitions were organized in 1840 in England and in 1865 the basic rules of the modern event were standardised there. Athletes have a short run up and then take off from one foot to jump over a horizontal bar and fall back onto a cushioned landing area. The men's high jump was included in the 1896 Olympics and a women's competition followed in 1928.

Jumping technique has played a significant part in the history of the event. High jumpers typically cleared the bar feet first in the late 19th century, using either the Scissors, Eastern cut-off or Western roll technique. The straddle technique became prominent in the mid-20th century, but Dick Fosbury overturned tradition by pioneering a backwards and head-first technique in the late 1960s – the Fosbury Flop – which won him the gold at the 1968 Olympics. This technique has become the overwhelming standard for the sport from the 1980s onwards. The standing high jump was contested at the Olympics from 1900 to 1912, but is now relatively uncommon outside of its use as an exercise drill.

==== Pole vault ====
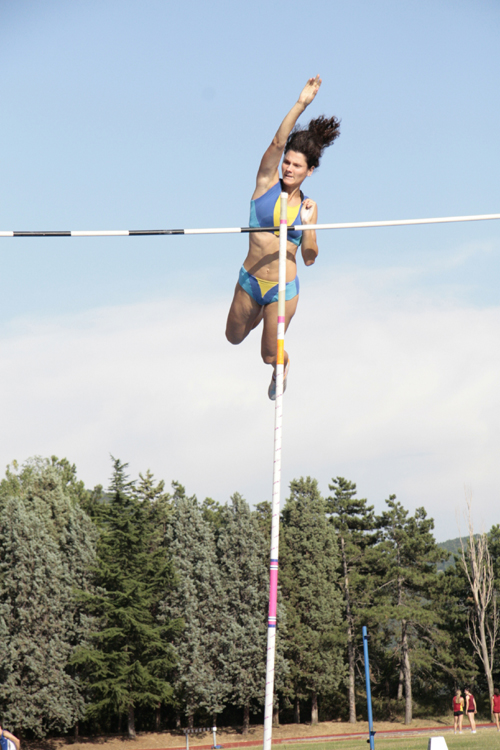
Anna Giordano Bruno releases the pole after clearing the bar in pole vault

In terms of sport, the use of poles for vaulting distances was recorded in Fierljeppen contests in the Frisian area of Europe, and vaulting for height was seen at gymnastics competitions in Germany in the 1770s. One of the earliest recorded pole vault competitions was in Cumbria, England in 1843. The basic rules and technique of the event originated in the United States. The rules required that athletes do not move their hands along the pole and athletes began clearing the bar with their feet first and twisting so that the stomach faces the bar. Bamboo poles were introduced in the 20th century and a metal box in the runway for planting the pole became standard. Landing mattresses were introduced in the mid-20th century to protect the athletes who were clearing increasingly greater heights.

The modern event sees athletes run down a strip of track, plant the pole in the metal box, and vault over the horizontal bar before letting go of the pole and falling backwards onto the landing mattress. While earlier versions used wooden, metal or bamboo, modern poles are generally made from artificial materials such as fibreglass or carbon fibre. The pole vault has been an Olympic event since 1896 for men, but it was over 100 years later that the first women's world championship competition was held at the 1997 IAAF World Indoor Championships. The first women's Olympic pole vaulting competition occurred in 2000.

=== Throwing ===
Track and field contains some of the foremost kinds of throwing sports, and the four major disciplines are the only pure throwing events to feature at the Olympic Games.

==== Shot put ====
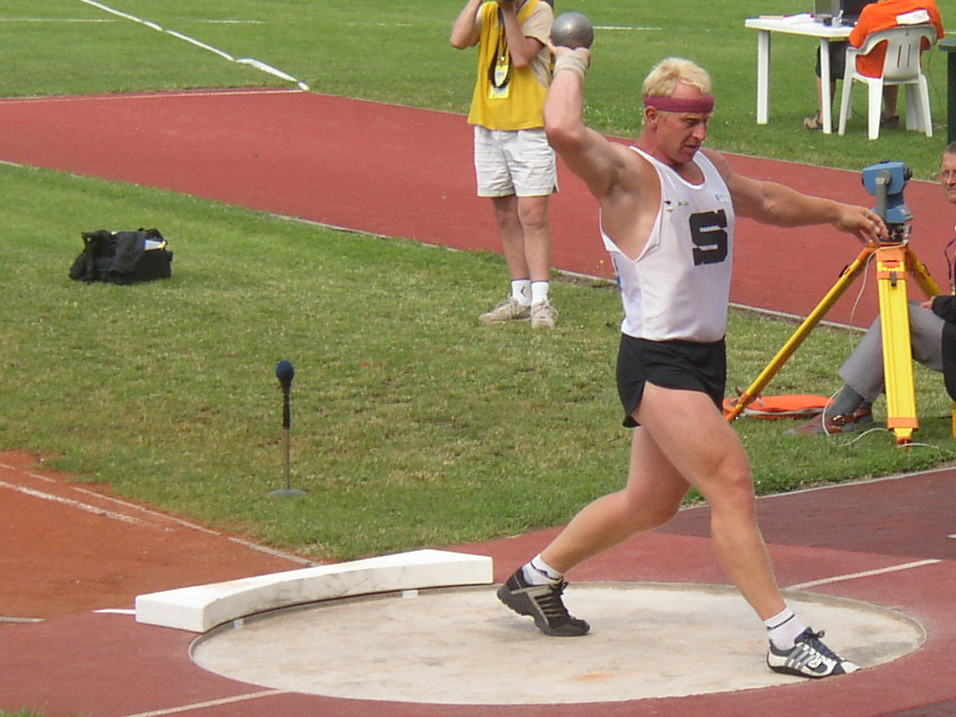
Remigius Machura preparing to throw within the circle in shot put

The genesis of the shot put can be traced to pre-historic competitions with rocks: in the Middle Ages the stone put was known in Scotland and the steinstossen was recorded in Switzerland. In the 17th century, cannonball throwing competitions within the English military provided a precursor to the modern sport. The term "shot" originates from the use of round shot-style ammunition for the sport. The modern rules were first laid out in 1860 and required that competitors take legal throws within a square throwing area of seven feet (2.1 m) on each side. This was amended to a circle area with a seven-foot diameter in 1906, and the weight of the shot was standardised to 16 pounds (7.3 kg). Throwing technique was also refined over this period, with bent arm throws being banned as they were deemed too dangerous and the side-step and throw technique arising in the United States in 1876.

The shot put has been an Olympic sport for men since 1896 and a women's competition using a 4 kg (8.8 lb) shot was added in 1948. Further throwing techniques have arisen since the post-war era: in the 1950s Parry O'Brien popularized the 180 degree turn and throw technique commonly known as the "glide", breaking the world record 17 times along the way, while Aleksandr Baryshnikov and Brian Oldfield introduced the "spin" or rotational technique in 1976.

==== Discus throw ====
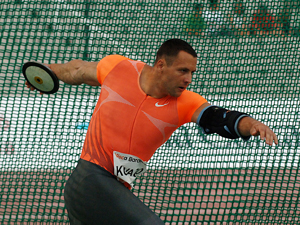
Zoltán Kővágó preparing to spin and throw in discus throw

In the discus throw, athletes compete to throw a heavy disc the farthest. In standard competitions, athletes throw the disc from a set circular arc and take turns in a series of throw, with the singular best effort deciding the victor. As one of the events within the ancient pentathlon, the history of the discus throw dates back to 708 BC. In ancient times a heavy circular disc was thrown from a set standing position on a small pedestal, and it was this style that was revived for the 1896 Olympics. This continued until the 1906 Intercalated Games in Athens, which featured both the ancient style and the increasingly popular modern style of turning and throwing. By the 1912 Olympics, the ancient standing throw style had fallen into disuse and contests starting within a 2.5 m squared throwing area became the standard. The discus implement was standardised to 2 kg (4.4 lb) in weight and 22 cm (8.7 in) in diameter in 1907. The women's discus was among the first women's events on the Olympic programme, being introduced in 1928. The first modern athlete to throw the discus while rotating the whole body was Czech athlete František Janda-Suk, who invented the technique when studying the position of the famous statue of Discobolus and won the 1900 Olympic silver medal.

==== Javelin throw ====
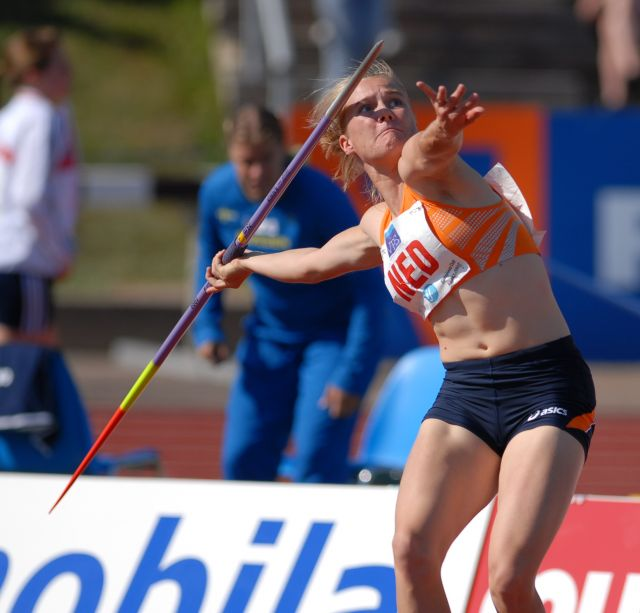
A javelin throw athlete

As an implement of war and hunting, the javelin throw began in prehistoric times. Along with the discus, the javelin was the second throwing event in the ancient Olympic pentathlon. Records from 708 BC show two javelin competition types co-existing: throwing at a target and throwing the javelin for distance. It was the latter type from which the modern event derives. In ancient competitions, athletes would wrap an ankyle (thin leather strip) around the javelin that acted as a sling to facilitate extra distance. The javelin throw gained much popularity in Scandinavia in the late 19th century and athletes from the region are still among the most dominant throwers in men's competitions. The modern event features a short run up on a track and then the thrower releases the javelin before the foul line. The runway measures at a minimum of 30 m in length, and is covered with the same surface as the track.

The first Olympic men's javelin throw contest was held in 1908 and a women's competition was introduced in 1932. The first javelins were made of various types of wood, but in the 1950s, former athlete Bud Held introduced a hollow javelin, then a metal javelin, both of which increased throwers performances. Another former athlete, Miklós Németh invented the rough-tailed javelin and throws reached in excess of 100 m – edging towards the limits of stadia. The distances and the increasing number of horizontal landings led the IAAF to redesign the men's javelin to reduce distance and increase the implement's downward pitching moment to allow for easier measurement. Rough-tailed designs were banned in 1991 and all marks achieved with such javelins were removed from the record books. The women's javelin underwent a similar redesign in 1999. The current javelin specifications are 2.6 to 2.7 m in length and 800 grams in weight for men, and 2.2 to 2.3 m and 600 g for women.

==== Hammer throw ====
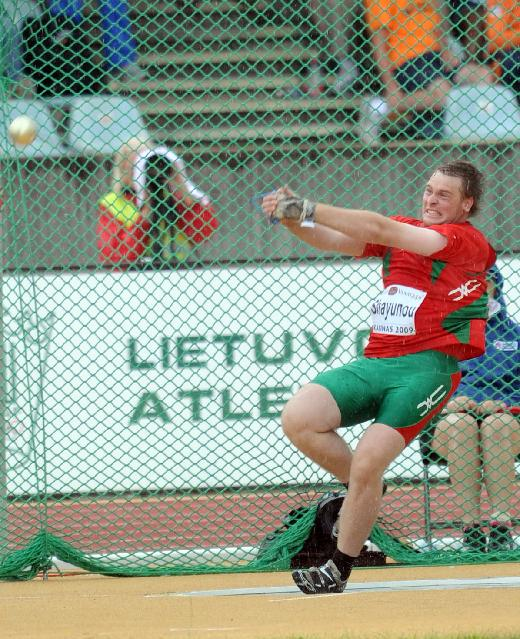
Yury Shayunou spinning with the hammer within the circle in hammer throw

The earliest recorded precursors to the modern hammer throw stem from the Tailteann Games of ancient Ireland, which featured events such as throwing either a weight attached to a rope, a large rock on a wooden handle, or even a chariot wheel on a wooden axle. Other ancient competitions included throwing a cast iron ball attached to a wooden handle – the root of the term "hammer throw" due to their resemblance to the tools. In 16th century England, contests involving the throwing of actual blacksmith's Sledgehammers were recorded. The hammer implement was standardised in 1887 and the competitions began to resemble the modern event. The weight of the metal ball was set at 16 pounds (7.3 kg) while the attached wire had to measure between 1.175 m and 1.215 m.

The men's hammer throw became an Olympic event in 1900 but the women's event – using a 4 kg (8.8 lb) weight – was not widely competed until much later, finally featuring on the women's Olympic programme in 2000. The distances thrown by male athletes became greater from the 1950s onwards as a result of improved equipment using the denser metals, a switch to concrete throwing areas, and more advanced training techniques. Professional hammer throwers were historically large, strong, sturdy athletes. However, qualities such as refined technique, speed and flexibility have become increasingly important in the modern era as the legal throwing area has been reduced from 90 to 34.92 degrees and throwing technique involves three to four controlled rotations.

== Combined events ==
Combined (or multi-discipline) events are competitions in which athletes participate in a number of track and field events, earning points for their performance in each event, which adds to a total points score. Outdoors, the most common combined events are the men's decathlon (ten events) and the women's heptathlon (seven events). Due to stadium limitations, indoor combined events competition have a reduced number of events, resulting in the men's heptathlon and the women's pentathlon. Athletes are allocated points based on an international-standard points scoring system, such as the decathlon scoring table.

The Ancient Olympic pentathlon (comprising long jump, javelin, discus, the stadion race and wrestling) was a precursor to the track and field combined events and this ancient event was restored at the 1906 Summer Olympics (Intercalated Games). A men's all-around was held at the 1904 Summer Olympics, contested between five American and two British athletes.

Composition of combined events
Event	Throws pentathlon	Women's indoor pentathlon	Men's indoor heptathlon	Women's heptathlon	Men's decathlon	Women's decathlon	Women's tetradecathlon	Men and women's indoor tetradecathlon	Men's icosathlon
60 m	✗	✗	✓	✗	✗	✗	✗	✓	✗
100 m	✗	✗	✗	✗	✓	✓	✓	✗	✓
200 m	✗	✗	✗	✓	✗	✗	✓	✓	✓
400 m	✗	✗	✗	✗	✓	✓	✓	✓	✓
800 m	✗	✓	✗	✓	✗	✗	✓	✓	✓
1000 m	✗	✗	✓	✗	✗	✗	✗	✗	✗
1500 m	✗	✗	✗	✗	✓	✓	✓	✓	✓
3000 m	✗	✗	✗	✗	✗	✗	✓	✓	✓
5000 m	✗	✗	✗	✗	✗	✗	✗	✓	✓
10,000 m	✗	✗	✗	✗	✗	✗	✗	✗	✓
60 m hurdles	✗	✓	✓	✗	✗	✗	✗	✓	✗
100 m hurdles	✗	✗	✗	✓	✗	✓	✓	✗	✗
110 m hurdles	✗	✗	✗	✗	✓	✗	✗	✗	✓
200 m hurdles	✗	✗	✗	✗	✗	✗	✓	✗	✓
400 m hurdles	✗	✗	✗	✗	✗	✗	✓	✗	✓
3000 m steeplechase	✗	✗	✗	✗	✗	✗	✗	✗	✓
Long jump	✗	✓	✓	✓	✓	✓	✓	✓	✓
Triple jump	✗	✗	✗	✗	✗	✗	✗	✓	✓
High jump	✗	✓	✓	✓	✓	✓	✓	✓	✓
Pole vault	✗	✗	✓	✗	✓	✓	✗	✓	✓
Shot put	✓	✓	✓	✓	✓	✓	✓	✓	✓
Discus throw	✓	✗	✗	✗	✓	✓	✓	✗	✓
Javelin throw	✓	✗	✗	✓	✓	✓	✓	✗	✓
Hammer throw	✓	✗	✗	✗	✗	✗	✗	✗	✓
Weight throw	✓	✗	✗	✗	✗	✗	✗	✓	✗

== Stadiums ==
=== Outdoor ===
A typical layout of an outdoor track and field stadium

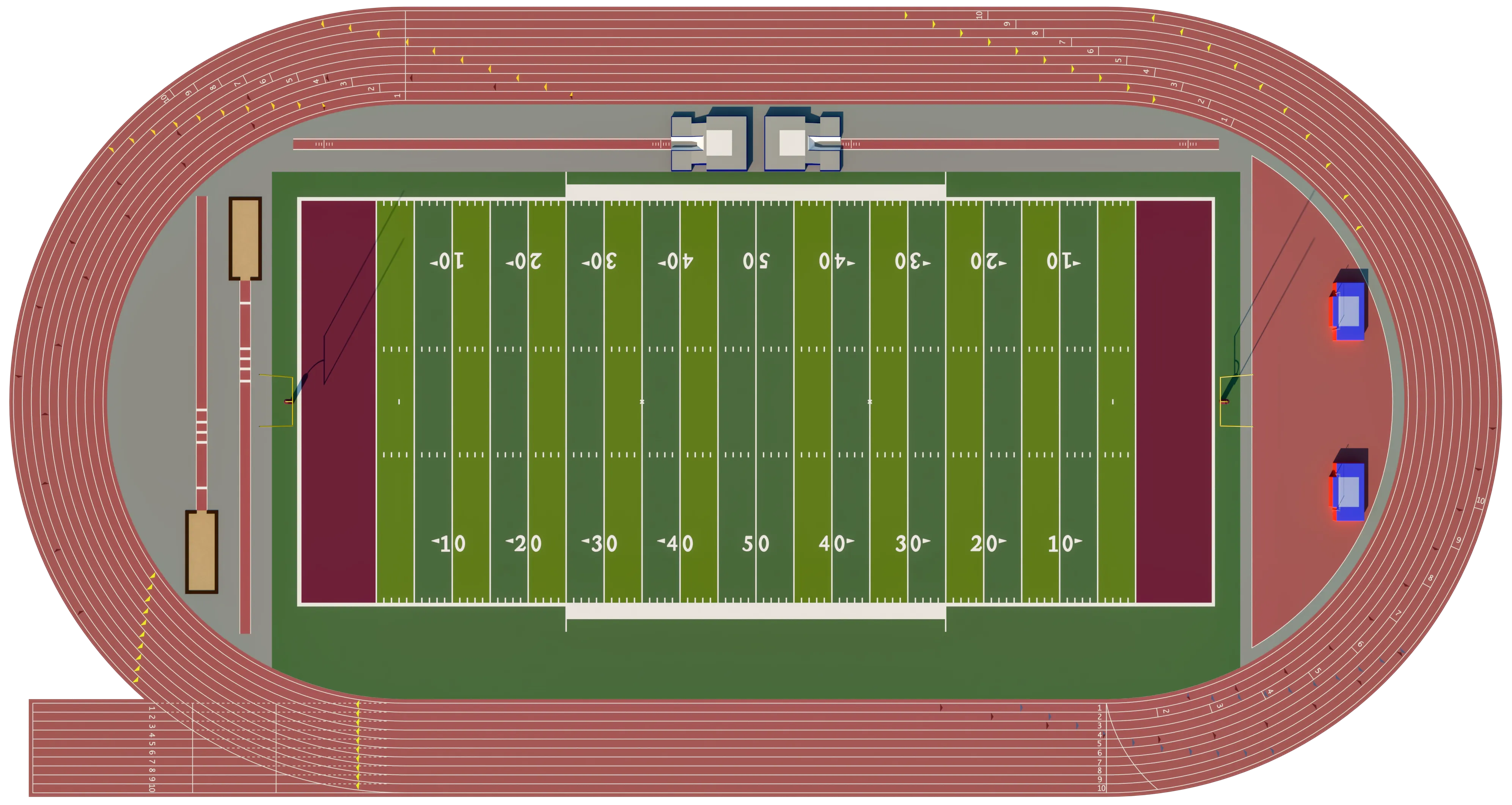
Track and field facilities layout around a football field for high school or college

The term track and field is intertwined with the stadiums that first hosted such competitions. The two basic features of a track and field stadium are the outer oval-shaped running track and an area of turf within this track—the field. In earlier competitions, track lengths varied: the Panathinaiko Stadium measured 333.33 metres at the 1896 Summer Olympics, while at the 1904 Olympics the distance was a third of a mile (536.45 m) at Francis Field. As the sport developed, the IAAF standardised the length to 400 m and stated that the tracks must be split into six to eight running lanes. Precise widths for the lanes were established, as were regulations regarding the curvature of the track. Tracks made of flattened cinders were popular in the early 20th century but synthetic tracks became standard in the late 1960s. 3M's Tartan track (an all-weather running track of polyurethane) gained popularity after its use at the 1968 US Olympic Trials and the 1968 Summer Olympics and it began the process in which synthetic tracks became the standard for the sport. Many track and field stadiums are multi-purpose stadiums, with the running track surrounding a field built for other sports, such as the various types of football.

The field of the stadium combines a number of elements for use in the jumping and throwing events. The long jump and triple jump areas comprise a straight, narrow 40-metre running track with a sandpit at one or both ends. Jumps are measured from a take off board—typically a small strip of wood with a plasticine marker attached—which ensures athletes jump from behind the measurement line. The pole vault area is also a 40-metre running track and has an indentation in the ground (the box) where vaulters plant their poles to propel themselves over a crossbar before falling onto cushioned landing mats. The high jump is a stripped-down version of this, with an open area of track or field that leads to a crossbar with a square area of landing mats behind it.

The four throwing events generally all begin on one side of the stadium. The javelin throw typically takes place on a piece of track that is central and parallel to the straights of the main running track. The javelin throwing area is a sector shape frequently across the Pitch (sports field) in the middle of the stadium, ensuring that the javelin has a minimal chance of causing damage or injury. The discus throw and hammer throw contests begin in a tall metal cage usually situated in one of the corners of the field. The cage reduces the danger of implements being thrown out of the field of play and throws travel diagonally across the field in the center of the stadium. The shot put features a circular throwing area with a toe board at one end. The throwing area is a sector. Some stadia also have a water jump area on one side of the field specifically for steeplechase races.

=== Indoor ===
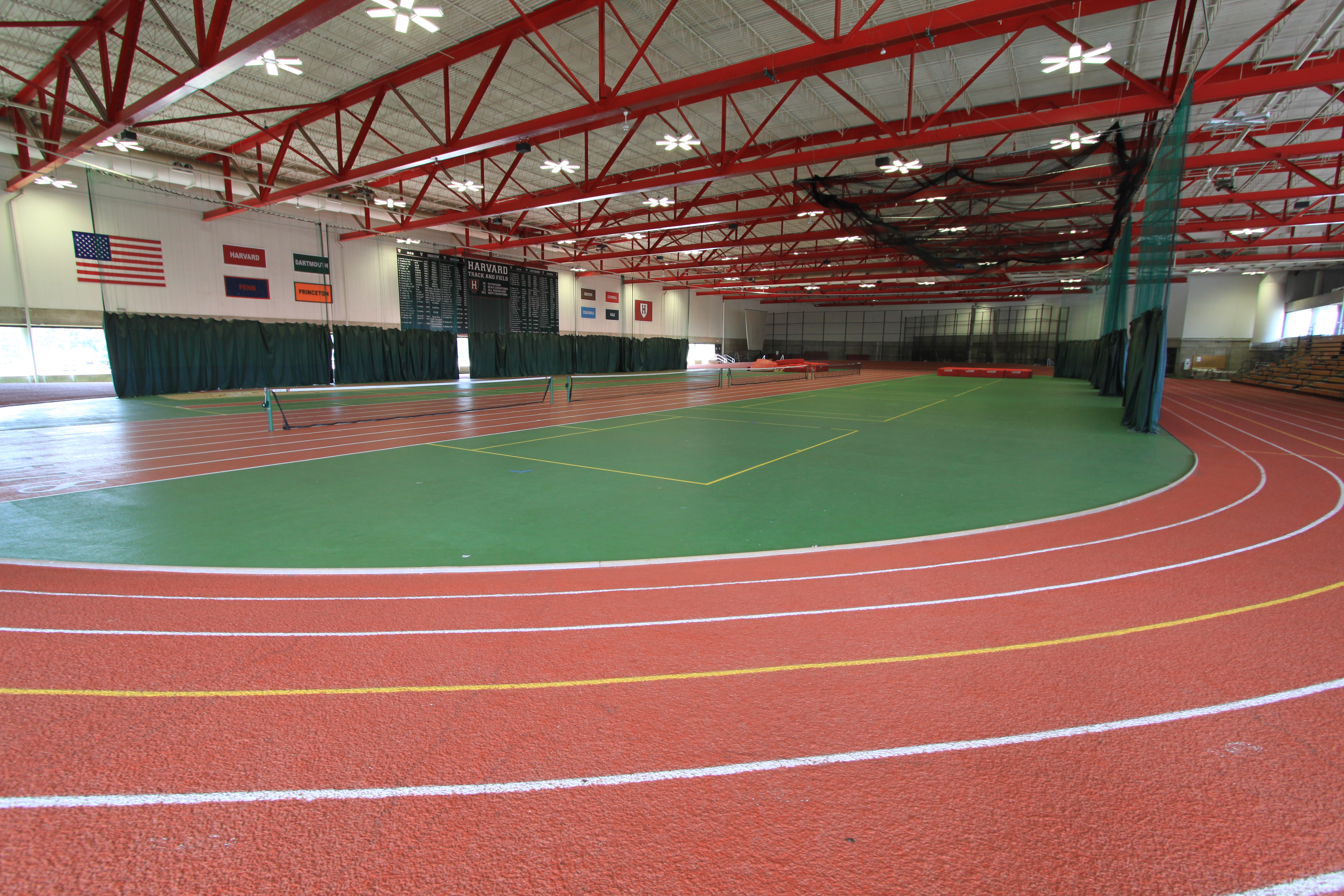
The Gordon Indoor Track features an 80-yard sprint straight, and the track is 220 yards in length.

Basic indoor venues may be adapted gymnasiums, which can easily accommodate high jump competitions and short track events. Full-size indoor arenas (i.e. those fully equipped to host all events for the World Indoor Championships) bear similarities with their outdoor equivalents. Typically, a central area is surrounded by a 200-metre oval track with four to eight lanes. The track can be banked at the turns to allow athletes to run around the radius more comfortably. Some have a second running track going straight across the field area, parallel to the straights of the main circuit. This track is used for the 60 meters and 60 metres hurdles events, which are held almost exclusively indoors.

Another common adaptation in the United States is a 160-yard track (11 laps to a mile; 148m) that fits into a common basketball court-sized arena. This was quite popular when races were held at imperial distances, which gradually was phased out by different organizations in the 1970s and 1980s. Examples of this configuration include the Millrose Games at Madison Square Garden, and the Sunkist Invitational formerly held in the Los Angeles Sports Arena.

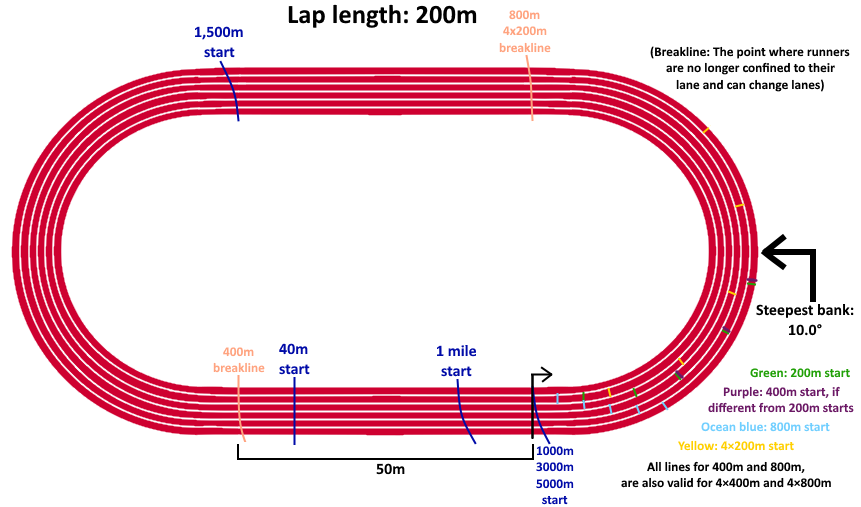
200 m short track oval running field. Does not show the inner central 60 m lanes.

All four of the common jumping events are held at indoor venues. The long and triple jump areas run alongside the central 60 m track and are mostly identical in form to their outdoor counterparts. The pole vault track and landing area are also alongside the central running track. Shot put and weight throw are the only throwing events held indoors due to size restrictions. The throwing area is similar to the outdoor event, but the landing sector is a rectangular section surrounded by netting or a stop barrier.

In addition to hosting the World Indoor Championships, the IAAF has hosted the IAAF World Indoor Tour since 2016.

In May 2023, World Athletics announced they were renaming "indoor track" and "indoor athletics" to "short track", effectively expanding the "indoor track" category to allow for the theoretical possibility of an outdoor 200 meter-track being used for valid "indoor" qualification marks. The change took effect at the beginning of 2024.

Extensive research has been done to highlight the physiological differences between running surfaces, suggesting nonmotorized indoor surfaces warrant higher oxygen uptake, heart rate etc. Several track athletes have experienced decreased mobility and stability after the strain of running on a shorter, indoor track. These conditions have caused running organizations, such as the NCAA to implement slower time conversions for indoor competition; conversion formulas vary by event.

Various events have been discontinued from the World Athletics Indoor Championships, including 200 m and race walking. Some race distance events have been held in world tour (IAAF World Indoor Tour and IAAF Indoor Permit Meetings in 1997 or later) events, including at Aviva Indoor Grand Prix and the Russian Winter Meeting, but never at the world championships, including:

- 300 m
- 500 m (Millrose Games during Permit Meeting status)
- 600 m
- 1000 m
- mile
- 2000 m
- 2 miles
- 5000 m
- 4 × 100 m (Sparkassen Cup)
- 4 × 200 m (Millrose Games)
- 4 × 800 m (Millrose Games during Permit Meeting status)
- 400 m hurdles (2011 Birmingham Indoor Grand Prix)
- 2000 m steeplechase (Indoor Flanders Meeting)

== Starts use in race ==
=== Track rules ===
The rules of track events in athletics as observed in most international athletics competitions are set by the Competition Rules of the International Association of Athletics Federations (IAAF). The most recent complete set of rules is the 2009 rules that relate only to competitions in 2009. Key rules of track events are those regarding starting, running and finishing. Current World Athletics (WA) Rules are available on WA's website. Current USATF (USA) Competition Rules booklet is available on the USATF website. Prior USATF Competition Rules booklets are also available (2002, 2006 to 2020).

==== Starting ====
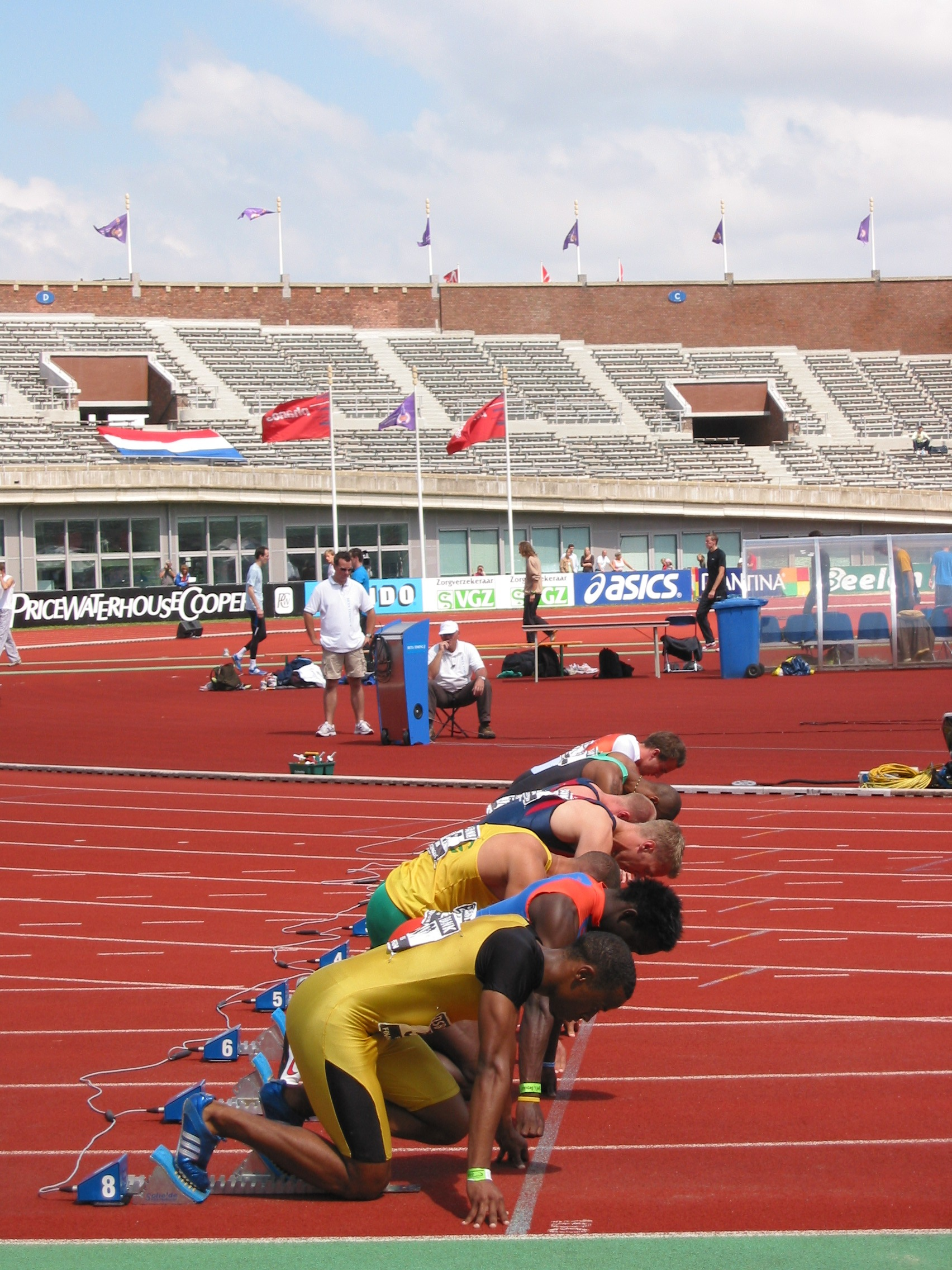
Men assuming the starting position for a sprint race

The start of a race is marked by a white line 5 cm wide. In all races that are not run in lanes the start line must be curved, so that all the athletes start the same distance from the finish. Starting blocks may be used for all races up to and including 400 m (including the first leg of the 4 × 100 m and 4 × 400 m) and may not be used for any other race. No part of the starting block may overlap the start line or extend into another lane.

All races must be started by the report of the starter's gun or approved starting apparatus fired upwards after they have ascertained that athletes are steady and in the correct starting position. An athlete may not touch either the start line or the ground in front of it with their hands or feet when on their marks.

For sprint races up to 400 m, the starter gives two commands: "on your marks" to instruct athletes to approach the start line, followed by "set" to advise the athletes that the start of the race is imminent. The commands of the starter are typically given in the native language in national competitions, or in English or French in international competitions. Once all athletes are set in their starting position, the gun or an approved starting apparatus must be fired or activated. If the starter is not satisfied that all are ready to proceed, the athletes may be called out of the blocks and the process started over.

There are different types of starts for races of different distances. Middle- and long-distance races mainly use the waterfall start. This is when all athletes begin on a curved line that moves farther out at the outer edge of the track. Competitors are allowed to move towards the inside lane right away, as long as it is safe to do so. For some middle-distance races, such as 800 m, each athlete starts in their own lane. Once the gun fires, they must run in the lane they began in until they reach a set of cones on the track that signal that they can cut in and move towards the inside lane. For sprint races, athletes begin in start blocks and must stay in their own lane for the entire race.

An athlete, after assuming a final set position, may not commence his starting motion until after receiving the report of the gun, or approved starting apparatus. If, in the judgment of the starter or recallers, he does so any earlier, it is considered a false start. It is deemed a false start if, in the judgment of the starter an athlete fails to comply with the commands "on your marks" or "set" as appropriate after a reasonable time; or an athlete after the command "on your marks" disturbs other athletes in the race through sound or otherwise. If the runner is in the "set" position and moves, then the runner is also disqualified. As of 2010, any athlete making a false start is disqualified.

In International elite competition, electronically tethered starting blocks sense the reaction time of the athletes. If the athlete reacts in less than 0.1 second, an alert sounds for a recall starter and the offending athlete is guilty of a false start. Since 2009, the offending athletes are immediately disqualified.

==== Running the race ====
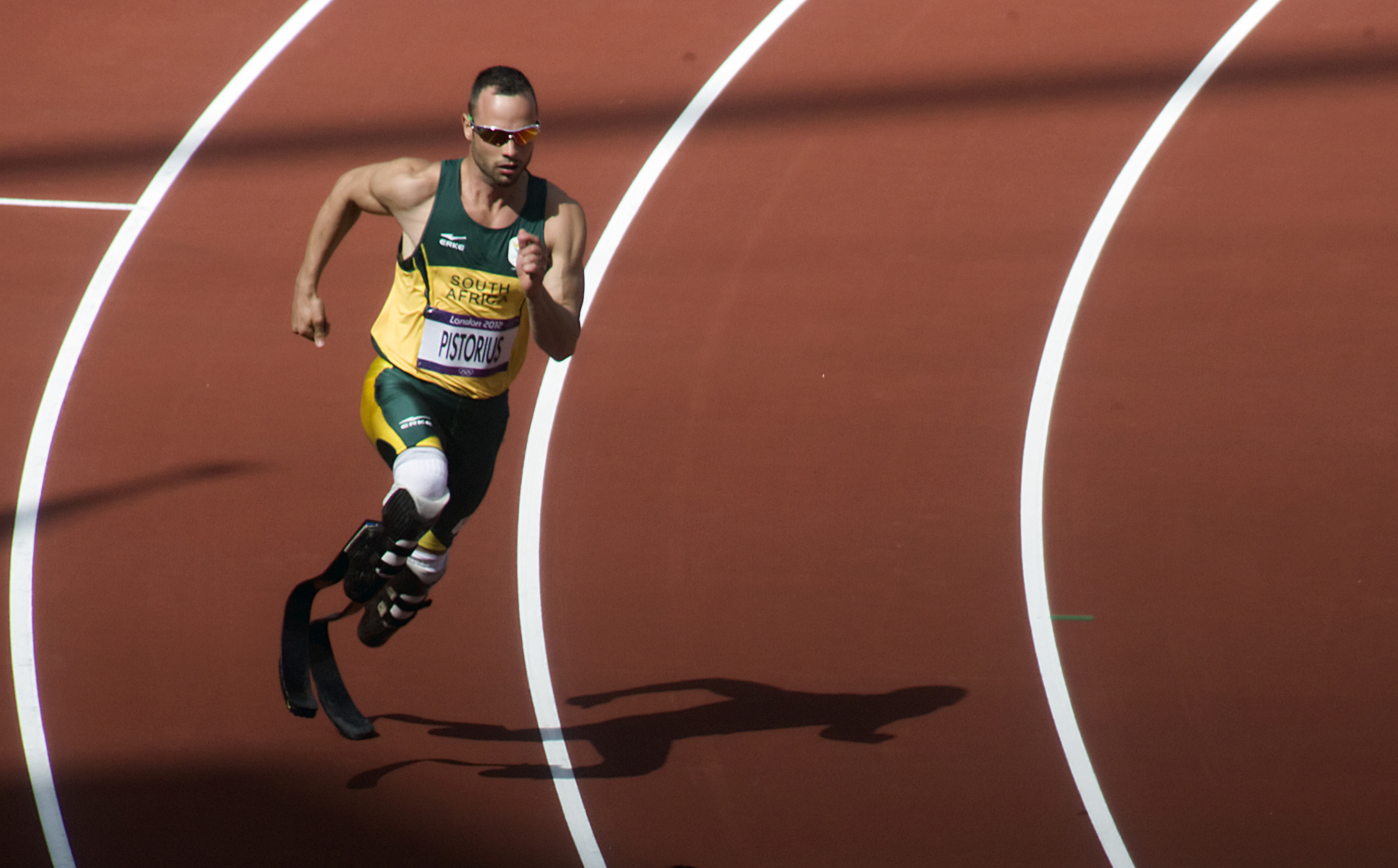
Oscar Pistorius running in the first round of the 400 m at the 2012 Summer Olympics

For sprinting events, except the 4 × 400 m relay and the indoor 400 metres, each athlete must run the race within their allocated lane from start to finish. If an athlete leaves their lane or steps on the line demarking each lane the athlete will be disqualified. Lane rules also apply for initial periods of other track races, for example, the beginning of the 800 m. Similar rules apply for longer distance races when a large field of athletes is present and separate starting points are designated, with the field merging into one group shortly after the starting phase.

Any athlete who jostles or obstructs another athlete, in a way that impedes his progress, should be disqualified from that event. However, if an athlete is pushed or forced by another person to run outside his lane, and if no material advantage is gained, the athlete should not be disqualified.

==== The finish ====
The finish of a race is marked by a white line 5 cm wide. The finishing position of athletes is determined by the order in which any part of their torso (as distinguished from the head, neck, arms, legs, hands or feet) reaches the vertical plane of the nearer edge of the finish line. Fully automatic timing systems (photo timing) are becoming more and more common at increasingly lower levels of track meets, improving the accuracy, while eliminating the need for eagle-eyed officials on the finish line. Fully automatic timing (FAT) is required for high level meets and any time a sprint record is set (though distance records can be accepted if timed by three independent stopwatches).

With the accuracy of the timing systems, ties are rare. Ties between different athletes are resolved as follows: In determining whether there has been a tie in any round for a qualifying position for the next round based on time, a judge (called the chief photo finish judge) must consider the actual time recorded by the athletes to one thousandth of a second. If the judge decides that there has been a tie, the tying athletes must be placed in the next round or, if that is not practicable, lots must be drawn to determine who must be placed in the next round. In the case of a tie for first place in any final, the referee decides whether it is practicable to arrange for the athletes so tying to compete again. If he decides it is not, the result stands. Ties in other placings remain.

=== Field rules ===
In general, most field events allow a competitor to take their attempt individually, under theoretically the same conditions as the other competitors in the competition. Each attempt is measured to determine who achieved the greatest distance.

==== Vertical jumps ====
Vertical jumps (high jump and pole vault) set a bar at a particular height. The competitor must clear the bar without knocking it off the standards that are holding the bar (flat). Three failures in a row ends the competitor's participation in the event. The competitor has the option to PASS their attempt, which can be used to strategic advantage (of course that advantage is lost if the competitor misses). A pass could be used to save energy and avoid taking a jump that would not improve their position in the standings. After all competitors have either cleared, passed or failed their attempts at a height, the bar goes up. The amount the bar goes up is predetermined before the competition, though when one competitor remains, that competitor may choose their own heights for the remaining attempts. A record is kept of each attempt by each competitor. After all competitors have taken their attempts, the one jumping the highest is the winner, and so on down the other competitors in the event. Ties are broken by first, the number of attempts taken at the highest height (fewest wins), and then if still tied, by the total number of misses in the competition as a whole. The bar does not go back to a lower height except to break a tie for first place or a qualifying position. If those critical positions are still tied after applying the tiebreakers, all tied competitors take a fourth jump at the last height. If they still miss, the bar goes down one increment where they again jump. This process continues until the tie is broken.

==== Horizontal jumps ====
Horizontal jumps (long jump and triple jump) and all throws must be initiated behind a line. In the case of horizontal jumps, that line is a straight line perpendicular to the runway. In the case of throws, that line is an arc or a circle. Crossing the line while initiating the attempt invalidates the attempt—it becomes a foul. All landings must occur in a sector. For the jumps, that is a sand filled pit, for throws it is a defined sector. A throw landing on the line on the edge of sector is a foul (the inside edge of the line is the outside edge of the sector). Assuming a proper attempt, officials measure the distance from the closest landing point back to the line. The measuring tape is carefully straightened to the shortest distance between the point and the line. To accomplish this, the tape must be perfectly perpendicular to the take off line in jumps, or is pulled through the center point of the arc for throws. The officials at the landing end of the tape have the zero, while the officials at the point of initiation measure and record the length. Whenever a record (or potential record) occurs, that measurement is taken (again) with a steel tape, and observed by at least three officials (plus usually the meet referee). Steel tapes are easily bent and damaged, so are not used to measure everyday competitions. For major competitions, each competitor gets three tries. The top competitors (usually 8 or 9 depending on that competition's rules) get three more tries. At that level of competition, the order of competitors for those final three attempts are set—so the competitor in first place at the end of the third round is last, while the last competitor to qualify goes first. Some meets rearrange the competition order again for the final round, so the final attempt is taken by the leader at that point. At other competitions, meet management may choose to limit all competitors to four or three attempts. Whatever the format, all competitors get an equal number of attempts.

== Equipment ==
Track and Field athletes wear special shoes with spikes, known as track spikes or simply spikes.

World Athletics has created an official, full shoe checker list for all racing flats and spikes that are eligible to be worn during track and field competitions. This is an internationally accepted standard that organizations including the NCAA are in compliance with. The standard is determined based on stack height and no shoe with a stack height greater than 25mm will be seen on the track.

Men and women have different weights for their throwing implements – men's javelin is 800 grams compared to 600 for women, men's weight throw is 35 pounds compared to 20 for women, men's discus is 2 kilograms to women's 1, men's shot put is 16 pounds compared to 8 pounds for women, and men's hammer throw is also 16 pounds to the women's 8. Additionally, men's high hurdles are at height of 42 inches compared to women's hurdles which are 33 inches. For the intermediate hurdles (400 meter hurdles), the men's hurdle height is 36 inches compared to 30 inches for women.

== Organizations ==
The international governance of track and field falls under the jurisdiction of athletics organizations. World Athletics is the global governing body for track and field, and athletics as a whole. The governance of track and field at continental and national level is also done by athletics bodies. Some national federations are named after the sport, including USA Track & Field and the Philippine Amateur Track & Field Association, but these organizations govern more than just track and field and are in fact athletics governing bodies. These national federations regulate sub-national and local track and field clubs, as well as other types of running clubs.

== Competitions ==
=== Olympics, Paralympics and world championships ===
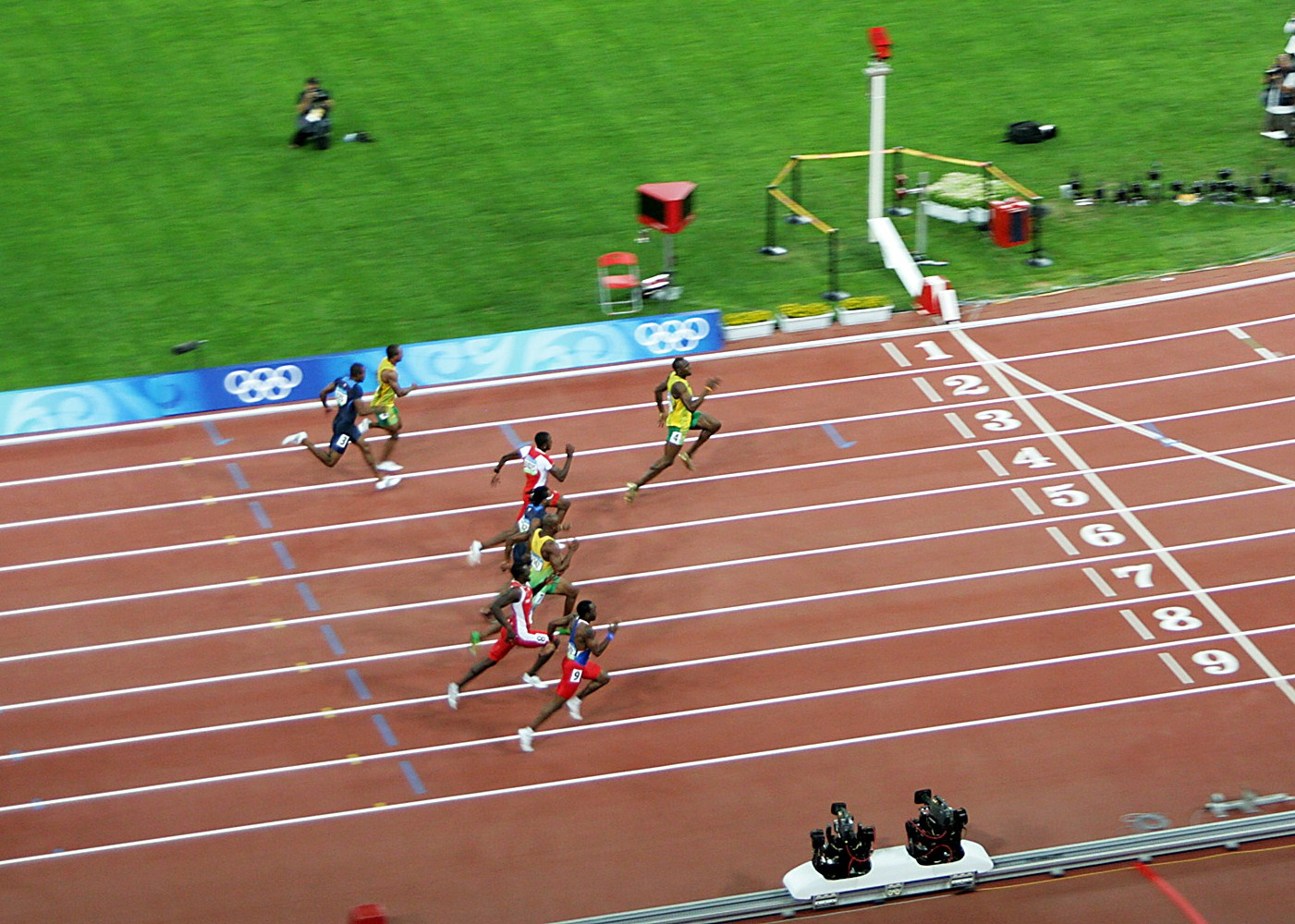
The 100 m final at the 2008 Summer Olympics

The major global track and field competitions are both held under the scope of athletics. Track and field contests make up the majority of events on the Olympic and Paralympic athletics programmes, which occur every four years. Track and field events have held a prominent position at the Summer Olympics since its inception in 1896, and the events are typically held in the main stadium of the Olympic and Paralympic Games. Events such as the 100 metres receive some of the highest levels of media coverage of any Olympic or Paralympic sporting event.

The other two major international competition for track and field are organized by the IAAF. The IAAF had selected the Olympic competition as its world championship event in 1913, but a separate world championships for athletics alone was first held in 1983 – the IAAF World Championships in Athletics. The championships comprised track and field competitions plus the marathon and race walking competitions. Initially, this worked on a quadrennial basis but, after 1991, it changed to a biennial format. In terms of indoor track and field, the IAAF World Indoor Championships has been held every two years since 1985 and this is the only world championships that consists of solely track and field events.

USA Track and Field has officially announced that in 2025 the USATF Para National Championships will take place at the Hayward Field at the University of Oregon. This is the first time in U.S. track and field history that Para will be showcased at the same championship meet as able-bodied athletes.

=== Other championships ===
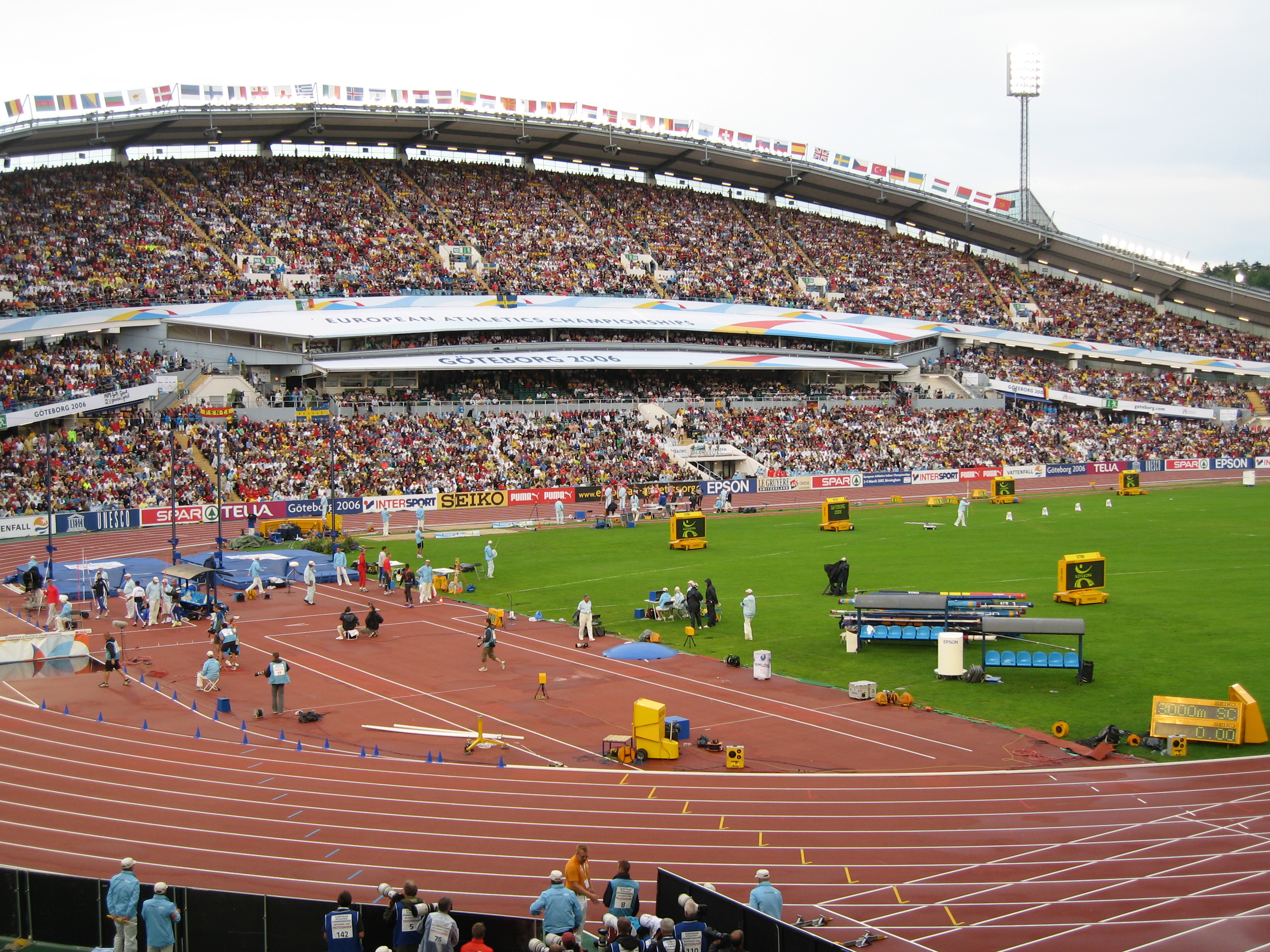
The 2006 European Athletics Championships at Ullevi Stadium

Similar to the event programmes at the Olympics, Paralympics and World Championships, track and field forms a significant part of continental championships. The South American Championships in Athletics, created in 1919, was the first continental championships and the European Athletics Championships became the second championships of this type in 1934. The Asian Athletics Championships and African Championships in Athletics were created in the 1970s and Oceania started its championships in 1990.

There are also indoor continental competitions in Europe (European Athletics Indoor Championships) and Asia (Asian Indoor Athletics Championships). There has not been a consistent championships for all of North America, which may be (in part) due to the success of both the Central American and Caribbean Championships and the USA Outdoor Track and Field Championships. Most countries have a national championship in track and field and, for athletes, these often play a role in gaining selection into major competitions. Some countries hold many track and field championships at high school and college-level, which help develop younger athletes. Some of these have gained significant exposure and prestige, such as the NCAA Track and Field Championship in the United States and the Jamaican High School Championships. However, the number and status of such competitions significantly vary from country to country.

=== Multi-sport events ===
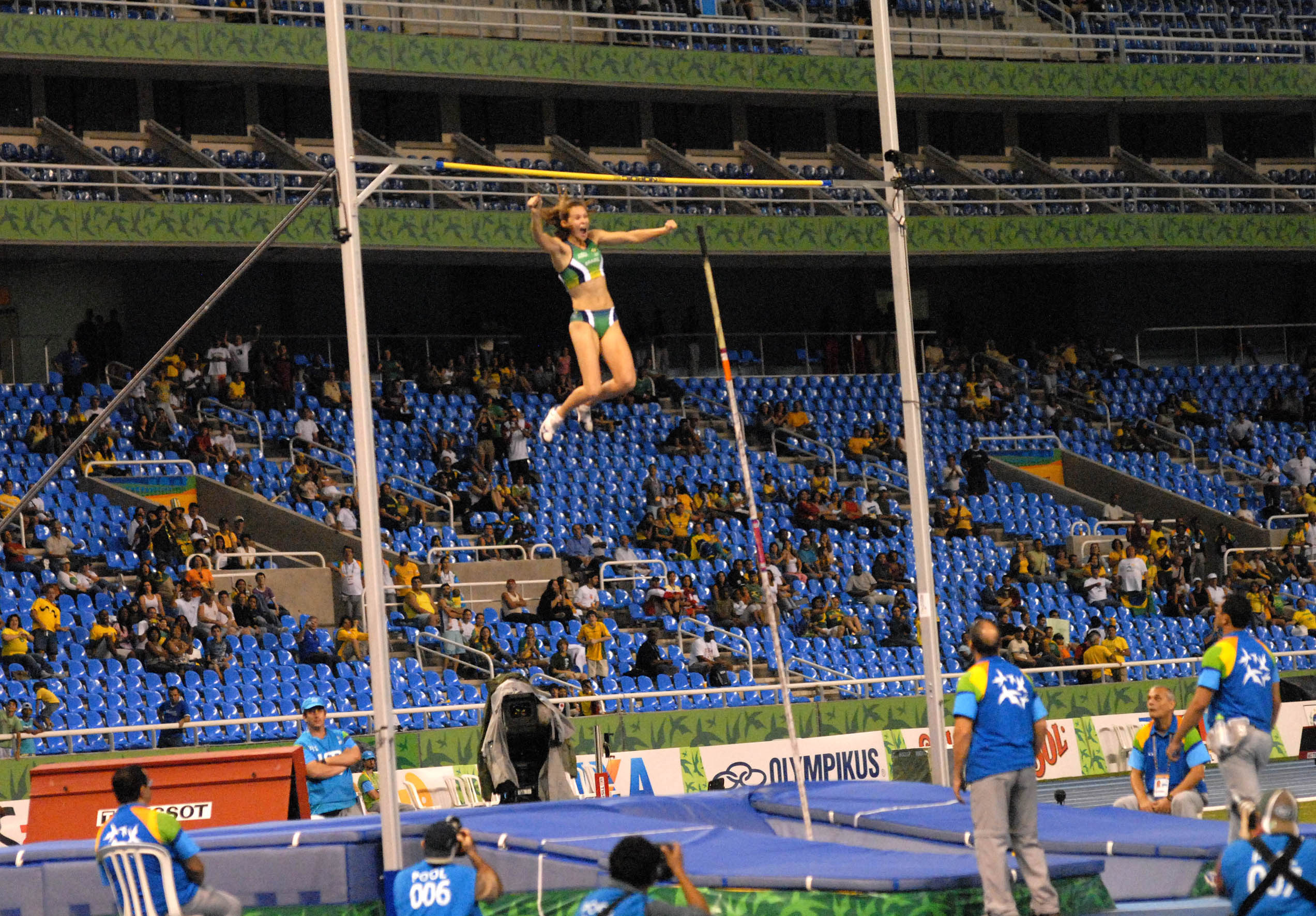
The pole vault competition at the 2007 Pan American Games

Mirroring the role that track and field events have at the Summer Olympics and Paralympics, the sport is featured within the athletics programmes of many major multi-sport events. Among some of the first of these events to follow the Olympic-style model were the World University Games in 1923, the Commonwealth Games in 1930, and the Maccabiah Games in 1932. The number of major multi-sport events greatly increased during the 20th century and thus did the number of track and field events held within them. Typically, track and field events are hosted at the main stadium of the games.

After the Olympic and Paralympic Games, the most prominent events for track and field athletes include the three IOC-sanctioned continental games: the All-Africa Games, Asian Games, and the Pan American Games. Other games such as the Commonwealth Games and Summer Universiade, and World Masters Games have significant participation from track and field athletes. Track and field is also present at the national games level, with competitions such as the Chinese National Games serving as the most prestigious national competition for domestic track and field athletes.

=== Meetings ===
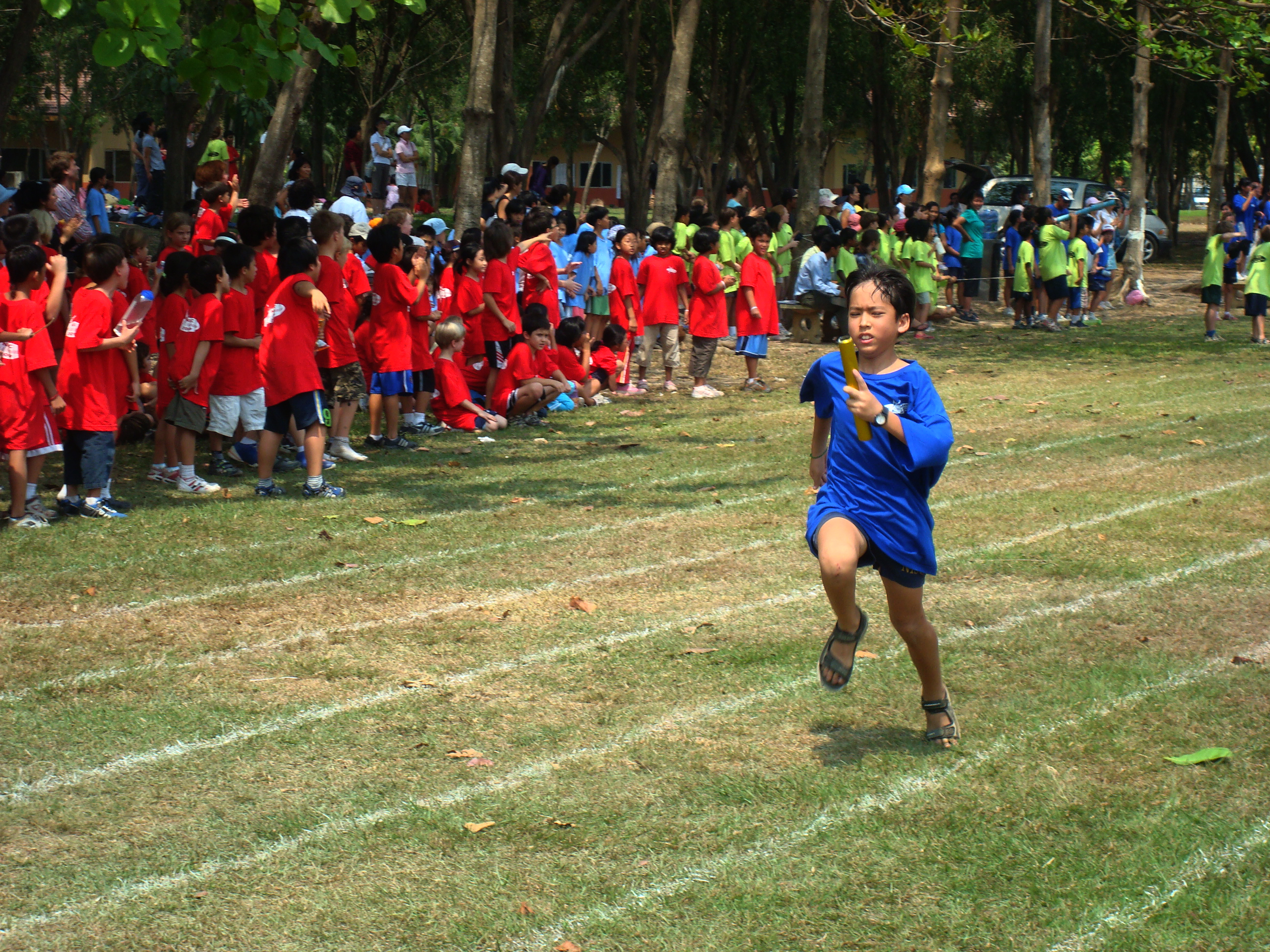
A child taking part in a local schools meeting in Cambodia

One-day track and field meetings form the most common and seasonal aspect of the sport – they are the most basic level of track and field competition. Meetings are generally organized annually either under the patronage of an educational institution or sports club, or by a group or business that serves as the meeting promoter. In the case of the former, athletes are selected to represent their club or institution. In the case of privately run or independent meetings, athletes participate on an invitation-only basis.

The basic meetings types are all-comers track meets, which are largely small, local, informal competitions that allow people of all ages and abilities to compete. As meetings become more organized they can gain official sanctioning by the local or national association for the sport.

At the professional level, meetings began to offer significant financial incentives for all athletes in the 1990s in Europe with the creation of the Golden Four competition, comprising meetings in Zürich, Brussels, Berlin and Oslo. This expanded and received IAAF backing as the IAAF Golden League in 1998, which was later supplemented by the branding of selected meetings worldwide as the IAAF World Athletics Tour. In 2010, the Golden League idea was expanded globally as the Diamond League series and this now forms the top tier of professional one-day track and field meetings.

=== World rankings ===
The IAAF World Rankings system was introduced for the 2018 season. An athlete's position within the ranking will be determined by points scored based on their performance and importance of the competition. The points will be considered for eligibility for the World Athletics Championships and Olympic Games. This system will affect athlete participation, which has typically been determined by national bodies, either through selection panels or national trials events.

=== Youth participation ===
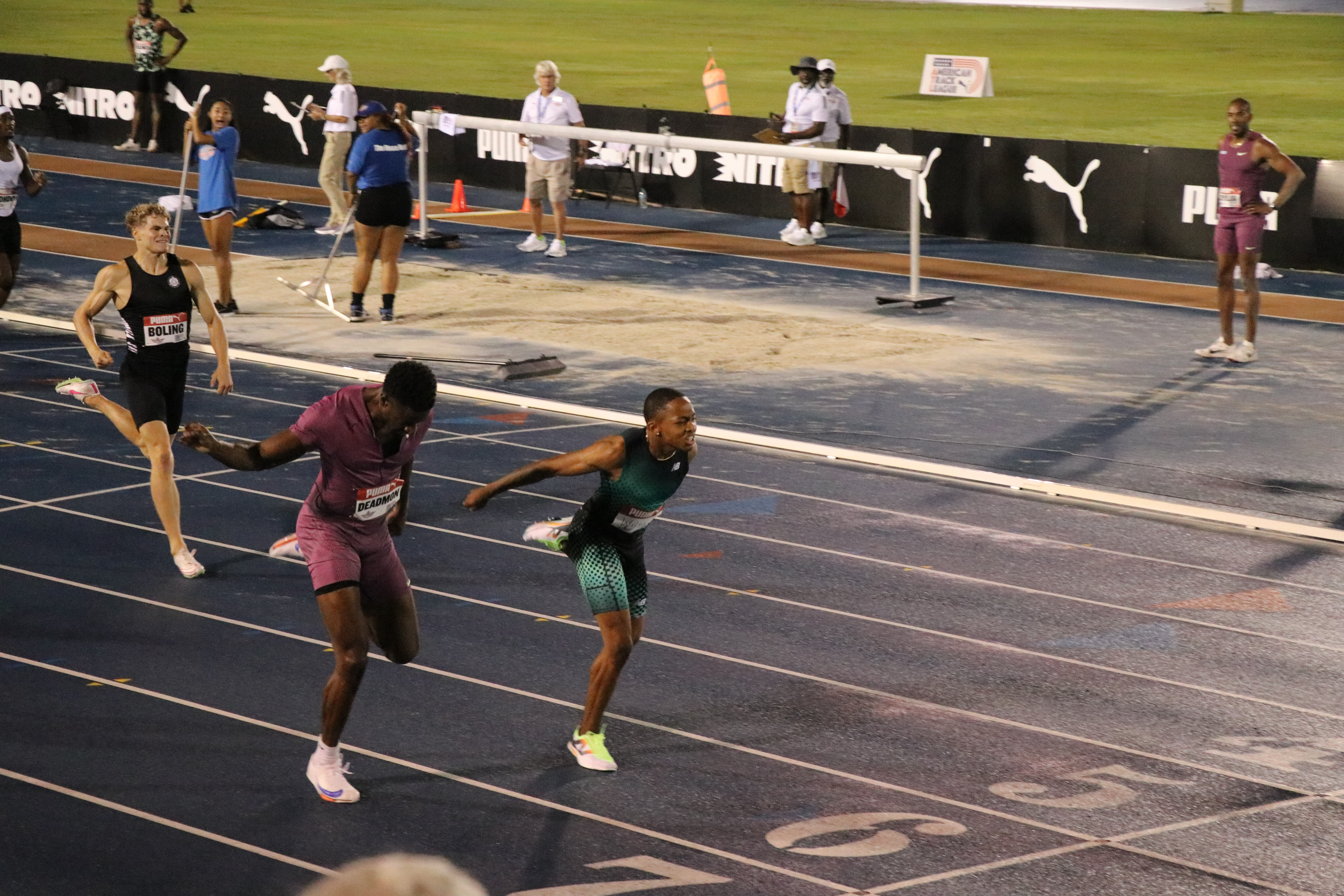
Quincy Wilson setting the U18 world record in the 400-meter dash

Youth involvement in the sport has grown substantially. In the United States alone, high school track and field reached a record of 1,131,348 participants in the 2023-2024 academic year. With this came standout young athletes, such as Quincy Wilson (runner) who broke the u18 world record in the 400-meter sprint four times and qualified for the U.S. Olympic 1,600 meter relay at age 16. He ended up running the preliminary round of the men's 4 × 400-meter relay and helped advance his team to the final, ultimately winning an Olympic gold medal.

== Records ==
A graph of the world record progression in the men's 100 metres

Athletes performances are timed or measured at virtually all track and field competitions. Doing so can not only serve as a way of determining the winner in an event, but it can also be used for historical comparison (i.e. a record). A large variety of record types exist and men's and women's performances are recorded separately. The foremost types of records organize athlete's performances by the region they represent—beginning with national records, then continental records, up to the global or world record level. National governing bodies control the national record lists, the area associations organize their respective continental lists, and the IAAF ratifies world records.

The IAAF ratifies track and field world records if they meet their set criteria. The IAAF first published a world records list in 1914, initially for men's events only. There were 53 recognized records in running, hurdling and relay, and 12 field records. World records in women's events began in 1936 as more events were gradually added to the list, but significant changes were made in the late 1970s. First, all records in imperial measurements were abandoned in 1976, with the sole exceptional being the mile run due to the prestige and history of the event. The following year, all world records in sprint events would only be recognized if fully automatic electronic timing was used (as opposed to the traditional hand-timing stopwatch method). In 1981, electronic timing was made compulsory for all world record runs in track and field, with times being recorded to within one hundredth of a second. Two additional types of world record were introduced in 1987: world records for indoor competitions, and world records for junior athletes under 20 years old.

The next most important record type are those achieved at a specific competition. For example, the Olympic records represent the best performances by athletes at the Summer Olympics. All major championships and games have their relevant competition records and a large number of track and field meetings keep a note of their meet records. Other record types include: stadium records, records by age range, records by disability, and records by institution or organization. Cash bonuses are usually offered to athletes if they break significant records, as doing so can generate greater interest and public attendance in track and field competitions.

== Doping ==
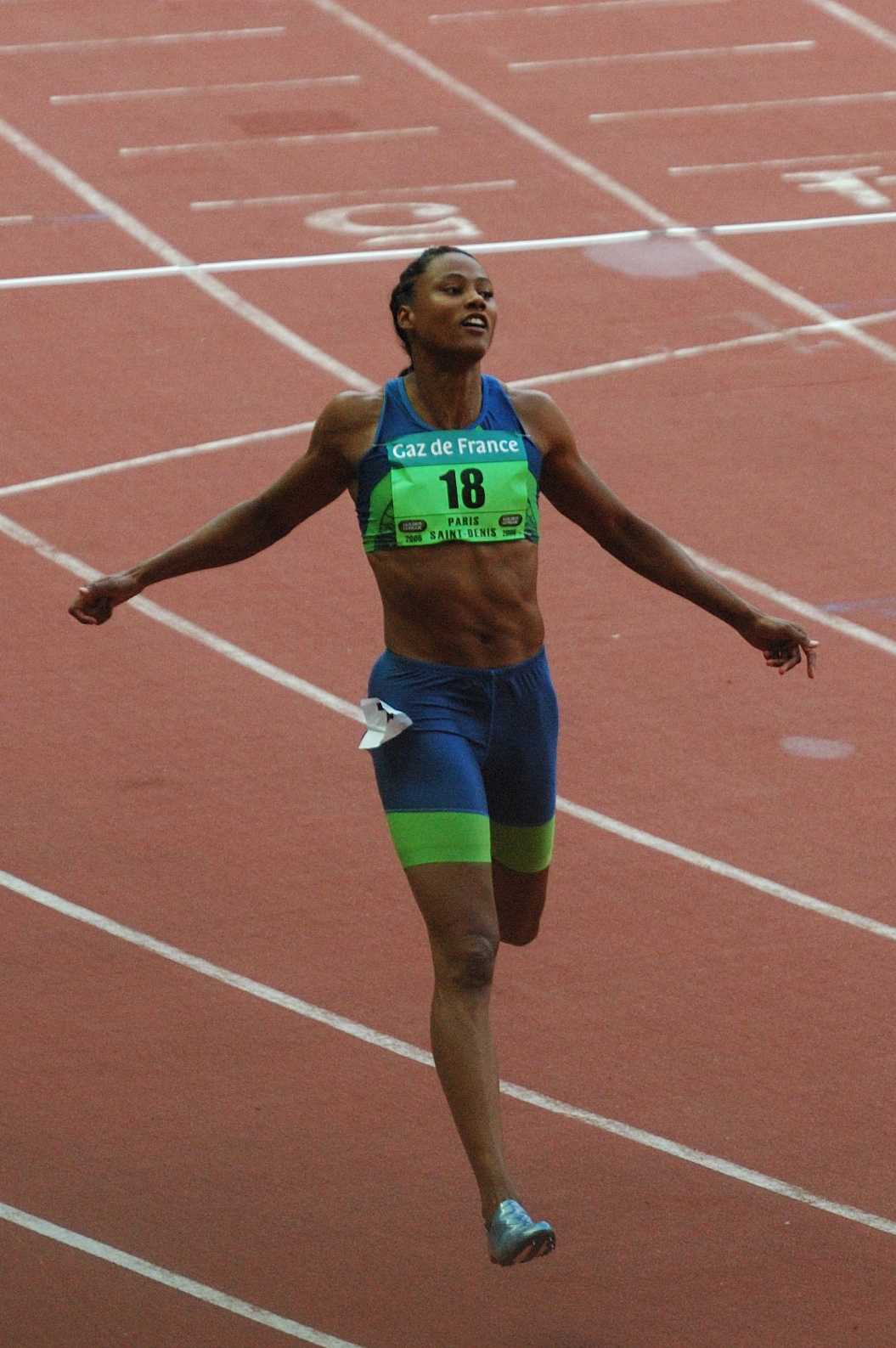
Marion Jones, after admitting to doping, lost her Olympic medals, was banned from the sport, and spent six months in jail.

Track and field athletes are banned from ingesting or using certain substances by governing bodies for the sport, from the national to the international level. The IAAF's constitution incorporates the World Anti-Doping Code among other anti-doping measures. Practices such as blood doping and the use of anabolic steroids, peptide hormones, stimulants, or diuretics can give athletes a physical competitive advantage in track and field. The use of such substances in track and field is opposed on both ethical and medical grounds. Given that the sport functions by measuring and comparing athletes' performances, performance-enhancing substances create an uneven playing field—athletes who do not use doping substances have a disadvantage over rivals who do. Medically, the use of banned substances may have an adverse effect upon athletes' health. However, some exemptions are made for athletes who take banned substances for therapeutic use, and athletes are not sanctioned for usage in these cases, such as Kim Collins' failed drug test due to asthma medication.

Athletes have historically been willing to take legal and health risks to improve their performance, with some even stating their willingness to risk their lives, as exemplified by research by Mirkin, Goldman and Connor in researching attitudes to the so-called Goldman dilemma. To prevent use of performance-enhancing substances, athletes must submit to drug tests that are conducted both in and out of competition by anti-doping officials or accredited medical staff. Penalized athletes are susceptible to higher testing upon return to competition. Athletes found to have taken substances on the World Anti-Doping Agency's banned list receive sanctions and may be banned from competition for a period of time that corresponds to the seriousness of the infraction. However, the use of substances not on the prohibited list may also result in sanctions if the substance is deemed similar to a banned substance in either composition or effect. Athletes may also be sanctioned for missing tests, seeking to avoid testing or tampering with results, refusing to submit to testing, through circumstantial evidence, or confession of use.

Doping has played a significant part in the modern history of track and field. State-sponsored doping in East Germany with hormones and anabolic steroids marked the rise of women from East Germany in track and field from the late 1960s to the 1980s. A number of these women, such as Marita Koch, broke world records and were highly successful at international competitions. Some athletes, who were following a doping plan from their teenage years, suffered significant health problems as a result of the regime. A similar state-sponsored doping system was developed in the Soviet Union. According to British journalist Andrew Jennings, a KGB colonel stated that the agency's officers had posed as anti-doping authorities from the International Olympic Committee (IOC) to undermine doping tests and that Soviet competitors were "rescued with [these] tremendous efforts". Regarding the 1980 Summer Olympics, a 1989 Australian study said, "There is hardly a medal winner at the Moscow Games, certainly not a gold medal winner, who is not on one sort of drug or another: usually several kinds. The Moscow Games might as well have been called the Chemists' Games." In 2016, The New York Times published an article detailing the use of doping by the Soviets in preparation for the 1984 Olympics. Ben Johnson ran a new world record in the 100 metres at the 1988 Seoul Olympics but was later banned for using anabolic steroids. In the mid-first decade of the 21st century, the BALCO Scandal eventually resulted in the downfall of prominent sprinters such as Marion Jones and Tim Montgomery, among others, through their usage of banned substances. The revelation state-sponsored doping in Russia led to an international ban on all its athletes in 2016, with Russians having to apply to the IAAF to compete as Authorised Neutral Athletes at events such as the 2016 Summer Olympics and 2017 World Championships in Athletics. Doping has affected countries on all continents and has occurred in individual, team and national settings.

== Related sports ==
Track and field bears most similarity to the others categorized under the sport of athletics, specifically cross country running, and road forms of race walking and running. All these forms of racing tend to record finishing times, have strictly defined start and finish points, and are generally individual in nature. Middle- and long-distance runners usually participate in cross country and road events, in addition to the track. Track racewalkers are most typically road specialists as well. It is unusual for track and field athletes outside of these two groups to compete in cross country or road events.

Varieties of strength athletics, such as the World's Strongest Man and highland games, often incorporate forms of footracing, carrying heavy objects, as well as throwing events such as the caber toss and keg toss, which bear similarities to track and field throwing events.

== See also ==
- Cross country running
- List of track and field stadiums by capacity
- Road running
