= Robert Goldman (inventor) =

American inventor

Robert J. Goldman
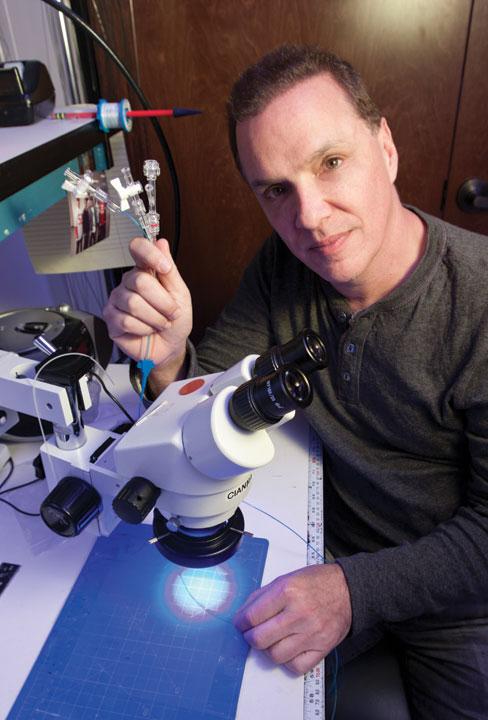
- Born: 1959 (age 66–67); Rochester, New York

Robert J. Goldman (born 1959 in Rochester, New York) is an American inventor responsible for pioneering technology in digital media as well as cancer treatment.

== Digital audio download patents ==
Goldman's early contributions focused on early online music commerce and targeted drug delivery. In the late 1990s, Goldman developed and patented technologies for digital audio systems wherein music could be stored, browsed, downloaded and purchased from digital databases. To support this technology, he launched GetMedia, Inc., a company directed to connect radio and streaming playlists with e-commerce “click-to-buy” links, in 1999. He then subsequently sold his intellectual property to Intellectual Ventures, an IP licensing company, for an undisclosed sum.

== Cancer treatment catheter ==
In 2002, Goldman launched the company, Vascular Designs, where he developed an innovative medical device, the IsoFlow infusion catheter. An important application for the IsoFlow catheter may be in the treatment of cancer. Goldman invented the device in an attempt to save his own sister, Amy Cohen, from colon cancer. The IsoFlow is a dual balloon catheter designed to isolate a specific treatment region within the body from blood flow. It allows the infusion of fluids into the region and the perfusion of blood past the region to keep the blood flow intact during treatment. One of the many unique features of the IsoFlow infusion catheter is the ability to deliver medications sideways while using pressure to push the medications into the targeted area. The IsoFlow catheter is inserted over a guide wire for precise positioning within a patient’s body. Once in place, medication is infused and isolated when both of the catheter’s balloons are simultaneously inflated using fluid via a single inflation lumen.

Vascular Designs secured U.S. Food and Drug Administration (FDA) 510(k) marketing clearance for its IsoFlow catheter as a Class II medical device in May 2009. With the IsoFlow catheter’s design, medications can be pushed into areas that could not previously be treated directly. According to numerous studies, this type of approach to delivery can increase drug concentrations at targeted sites while reducing systemic exposure, potentially improving treatment outcomes.
