= Goldman's dilemma =

Question posed to athletes about whether they would take a drug that would kill them

Goldman's dilemma, or the Goldman dilemma, is a question that was posed to elite athletes by physician, osteopath and publicist Robert M. Goldman, asking whether they would take a drug that would guarantee them overwhelming success in sport, but cause them to die after five years. In his research, as in previous research by Mirkin, approximately half the athletes responded that they would take the drug, but modern research by James Connor and co-workers has yielded much lower numbers, with athletes having levels of acceptance of the dilemma that were similar to the general population of Australia.

== History ==
In the 1970s, Gabe Mirkin reported that more than half of the top runners whom he polled, would accept the following proposal: "If I could give you a pill that would make you an Olympic champion and also kill you in a year, would you take it?". This surprising result prompted Bob Goldman to ask world-class athletes in combat and power sports a similar question: "If I had a magic drug that was so fantastic that if you took it once you would win every competition you would enter from the Olympic Decathlon to the Mr Universe, for the next five years but it had one minor drawback, it would kill you five years after you took it, would you still take the drug?" He also found that more than half said they would take it. This result was consistent in his findings over a period from 1982 to 1995.^{cited in}

Because of the shocking implications they held around doping in sport, Mirkin's and Goldman's results were widely reported, but also criticized.

== Later research ==
In 2009, Connor et al. reported that members of the general Australian public, surveyed by phone, overwhelmingly rejected Goldman's dilemma. The authors' conclusion at the time was that athletes were very different from the general public in terms of their attitudes to risk and victory. However, a later survey that they ran at an elite-level track and field event in USA showed similarly low levels (around 1%) of acceptance of the proposition of assured victory by illegal drug use followed by death. If the proposed drug were legal but deadly, around 6% would take it, and if it were illegal but harmless, around 12% said they would take it. They explain this difference in terms of changing attitudes in sport, both due to increased understanding of the risks of doping and the development of a clearer moral stance on doping.

== See also ==
- List of doping cases in sports
- List of drugs banned by WADA
