= Yeovil Olympiads Athletics Club =

Coordinates: 50°57′06″N 2°38′18″W

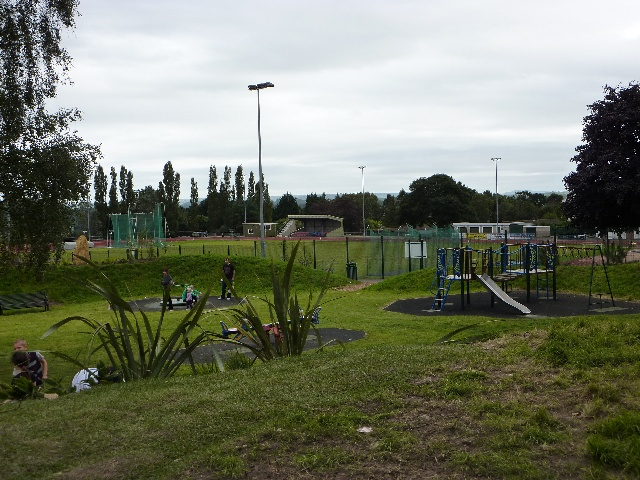
The athletics stadium behind the play area

Yeovil Olympiads Athletics Club was the first track and field athletics club in Yeovil, Somerset, England. The club is based at the Bill Whistlecroft Athletics Arena, formerly Yeovil Arena before it was renamed on 14 September 2014.

This club was founded in 1969. It has produced many international athletes since its creation. The first was Eric Berry who came 6th in the 1973 European Juniors in the hammer event. Olympians who started with the club include Max Robertson and Gary Jennings, both 400 metres hurdlers.

In 2008, the senior men's section of the club was promoted to the British Athletics League. The Club gained promotion to Division 3 of the League in 2014.

In 2009, the club will also contest the South West Athletics League, The Southern Women's League, and The Young Athletes League. In 2010 the title of Top Athletics Team in the South West was awarded by UK Athletics and South Somerset District Council who awarded the Club Top Sports Team in the area.

In 2017, the club is contesting the British Athletics League, the Southern Athletics League and the South-West Athletics League.

Athletes join with Wells City Harriers for Road Running and Cross Country events.

The club is affiliated to South of England Athletics Association and England Athletics.

== 2013 IAUM World Championships ==
In 2013, after holding a test event in 2012, Yeovil Olympiads hosted the International Association for Ultra-Multievents World Championships from 24 to 25 August, consisting of an icosathlon and tetradecathlon.

== Kit ==
The club vest has an orange body with dark blue sides. Club athletes typically wear black shorts.
