= Tibet Art Center =

Tibet Art Center is an art museum in Alastaro, Loimaa, Finland in a building that was previously an elementary school. The art center also functions as a Buddhist dharma school, meditation center and yoga school. The art center is owned by a Buddhist dharma center (Finnish Buddhalainen Dharmakeskus), which is located in Helsinki.

The collection of the art center consists mainly of Tibetan thangka paintings, ritual artifacts, statues and jewelry. The majority of the collection comes from Nepal and there are around 200 individual items. The gilded statues of the collection are made out of bronze. The collection was started by musician, artist and meditation instructor Pekka Airaksinen in 1974. The art center was officially opened in 2017. A meditation school was opened earlier but kept a low profile partly due to the negative attitudes from the Evangelical Lutheran Church although it was not entirely closed off from the outsiders.
