= Loimaan Lehti =

Newspaper published in Finland

- Type: newspaper
- Format: Berliner
- Publisher: Priimus Media Oy
- Editor-in-chief: Kati Uusitalo
- Staff writers: 9
- Founded: 1915
- Language: Finnish
- Readership: 25,000 (2021)
- Website: https://www.loimaanlehti.fi

Loimaan Lehti is the local newspaper of Loimaa. The newspaper was first published in 1915 and today comes out on Tuesdays, Thursdays and Saturdays.

In addition to Loimaa itself, Loimaan Lehti covers also the municipalities of Oripää, Ypäjä, Humppila, Punkalaidun and Vampula (today part of Huittinen). In 2021 the estimated readership of the newspaper was around 25,000 people (including the e-paper). In Loimaa the newspaper reaches 100% of the population and in neighbouring Oripää 74.5%.

The current editor-in-chief of the newspaper is Kati Uusitalo. In total the newspaper employs nine people.
