= K. N. Rantakari =

Finnish journalist and politician (1877–1948)

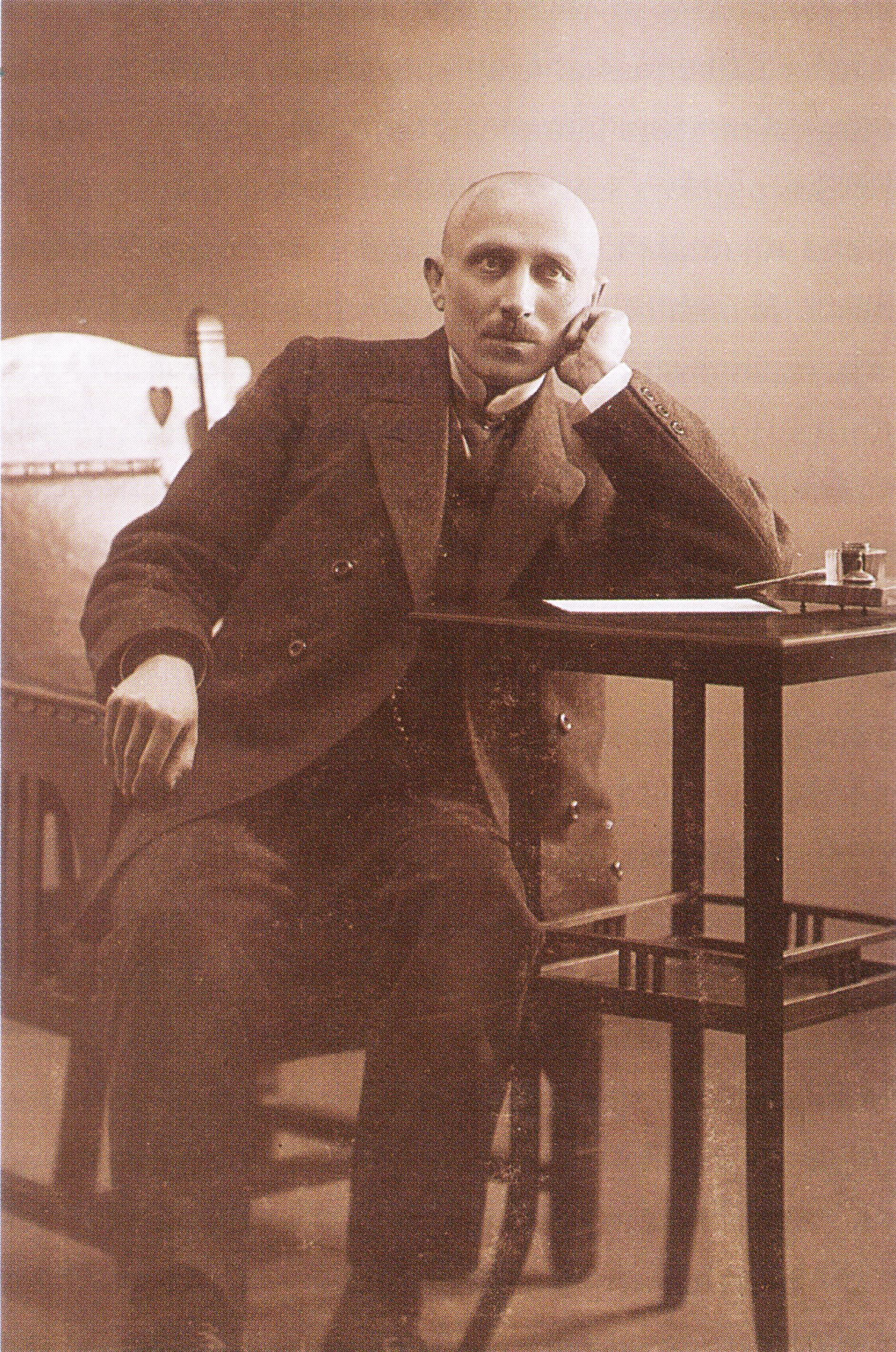
K. N. Rantakari

Kaarle Nestor (K. N.) Rantakari (21 January 1877 – 26 July 1948; surname until 1896 Grönqvist) was a Finnish journalist and politician, born in Loimaa. He was a member of the Parliament of Finland from 1916 to 1917, representing the Finnish Party. After the Finnish Party ceased to exist in December 1918, he was active in the National Coalition Party.
