= Pekka Airaksinen =

Finnish composer (1945–2019)

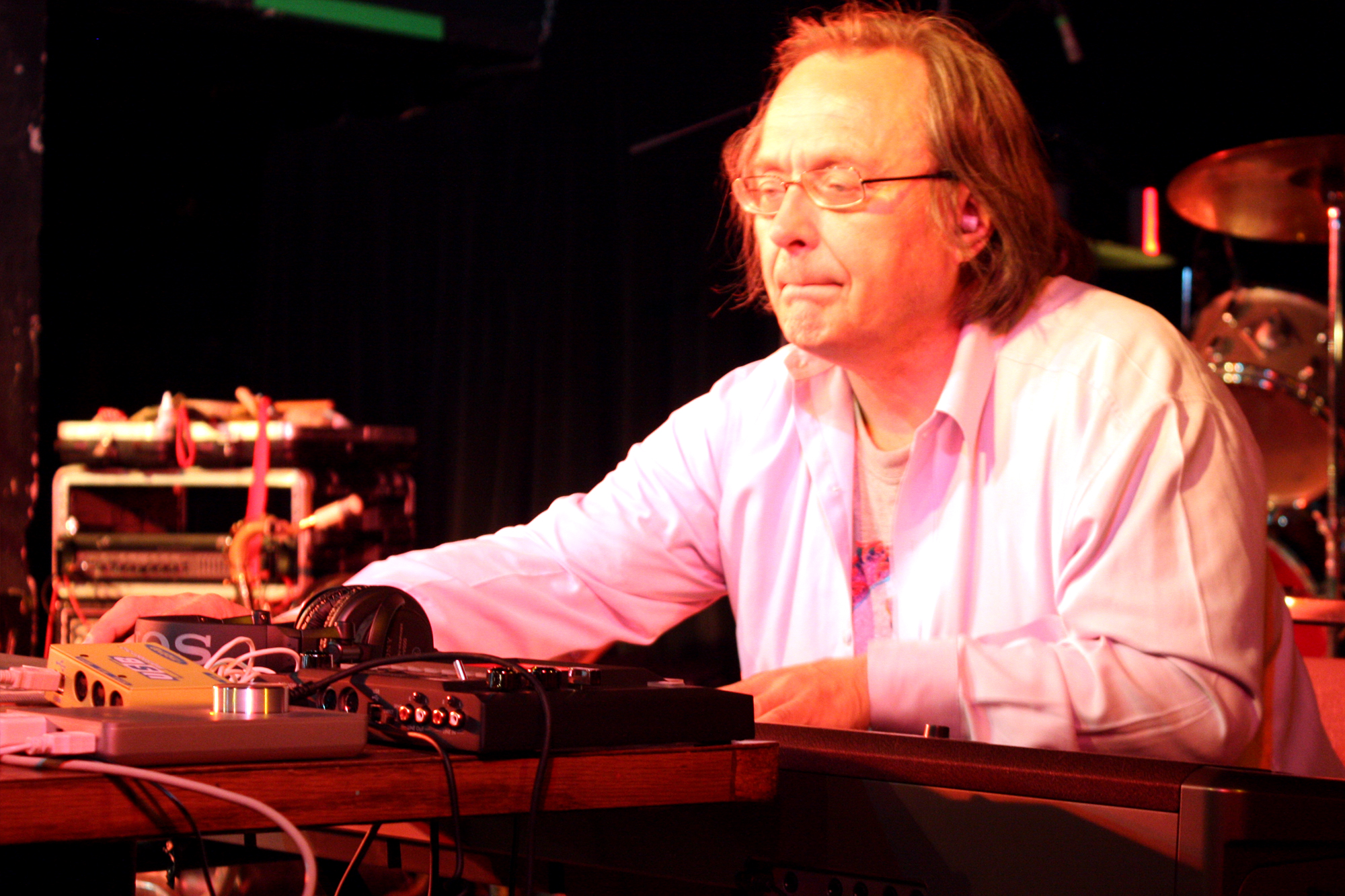
Pekka Airaksinen

Pekka Airaksinen (1945 – 6 May 2019) was a Finnish composer of electronic music.

Airaksinen formed his first band, The Sperm, in the 1960s. The Sperm mixed elements of avant-garde music with free jazz and psychedelic pop. Their concerts featured confrontational performance art, which resulted in two members being arrested for simulating sexual intercourse and screening pornographic films.

Following The Sperm's breakup in the early 1970s, Airaksinen turned to Buddhism and ceased making music. He started to collect Tibetan art and started Tibet Art Center in Loimaa. He returned to music in the mid-1980s with his album Buddhas of Golden Light, which mixed free jazz with percussion from a Roland 808 drum machine.

In the 1990s, Airaksinen founded the Dharmakustannus label, on which he released numerous CDs and CD-Rs. The music styles of these releases varies considerable, ranging from new age, ambient, house, jazz and improvisation.

Pekka Airaksinen died on 6 May 2019, at the age of 73.

== Discography ==
- One Point Music (1972)
- Buddhas of Golden Light (1984)
- Inner Galaxies (1996)
- Madam I'm Adam (2003)
- Sakyamuni 2005
- Mahagood (2007)
