= 2013 IAUM World Championships =

The 2013 IAUM World Championships were the 24th edition of the International Association for Ultra-Multievents World Championships. They were held at the Yeovil Olympiads Athletics Club track in Yeovil, Somerset, from 24-25 August 2013. It was the fourth time that Great Britain had hosted the World Championships.

== Event schedule ==
The event was made up of two different combined events competitions, an icosathlon for men and a tetradecathlon for women.

Event #	Icosathlon		Tetradecathlon	
Event #	Day 1	Day 2	Day 1	Day 2
1	100 metres	110 metre hurdles	100 metre hurdles	100 metres
2	Long jump	Discus throw	High jump	Long jump
3	200 metre hurdles	200 metres	1500 metres	400 metres
4	Shot put	Pole vault	400 metre hurdles	Javelin throw
5	5000 metres	3000 metres	Shot put	800 metres
6	800 metres	400 metre hurdles	200 metres	200 metre hurdles
7	High jump	Javelin throw		Discus throw
8	400 metres	1500 metres		3000 metres
9	Hammer throw	Triple jump		
10	3000 metre steeplechase	10000 metres		
