= Jaakola =

Surname list

Jaakola is a Finnish surname. Notable people with the name include:

- Alpo Jaakola (1929–1997), Finnish painter and sculptor
- Jorma Jaakola (born 1950), Finnish athlete in javelin throw
- Topi Jaakola (born 1983), Finnish ice hockey player
