= Church of Loimaa Proper =

Coordinates: 60.8757°N 22.9752°E

- Finnish: Kanta-Loimaan kirkko
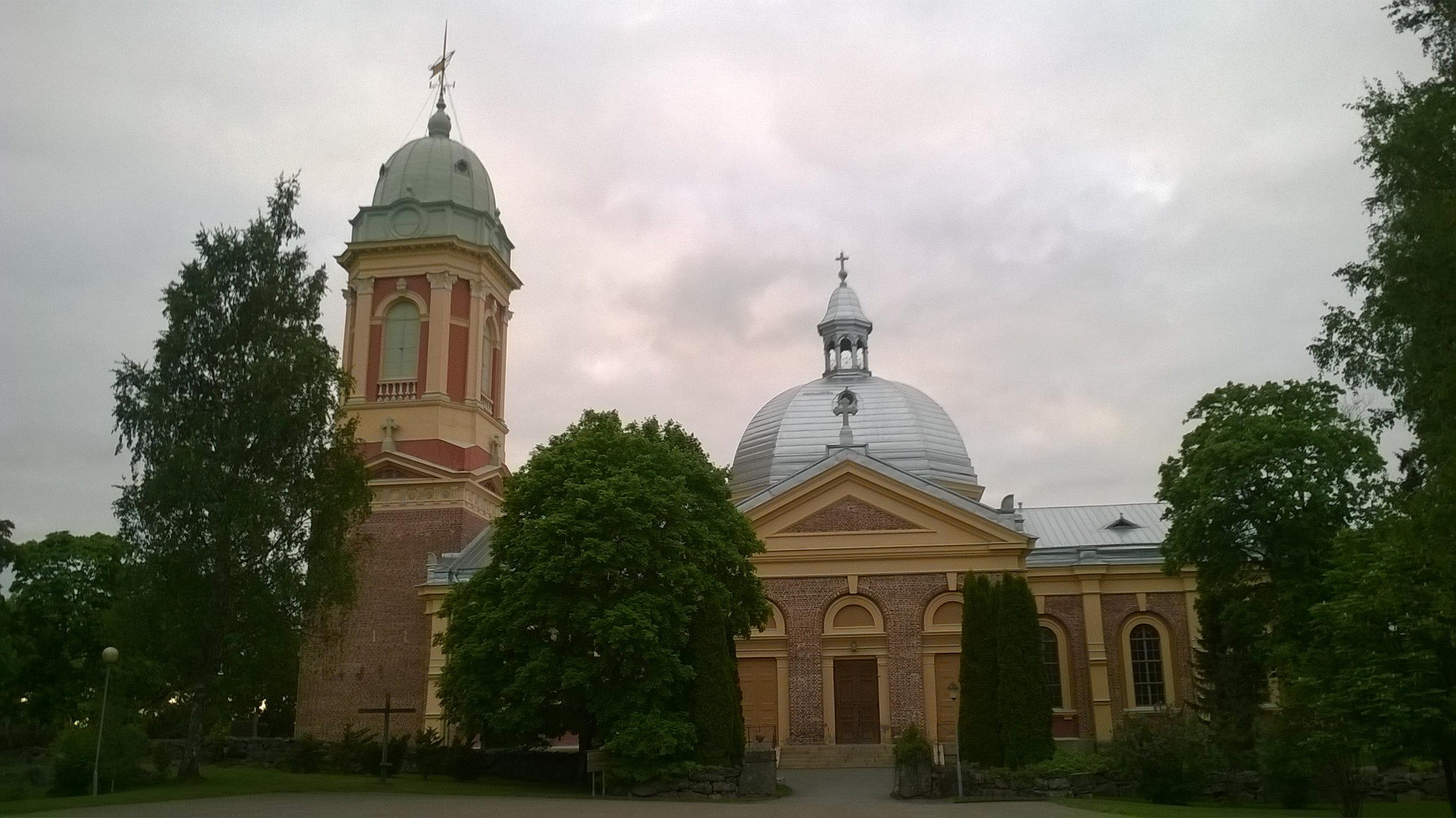
- The church in 2016
- Church of Loimaa Proper
- Location: Loimaa
- Country: Finland
- Denomination: Lutheran

Architecture
- Architect(s): Carlo Bassi; Carl Ludvig Engel; Josef Stenbäck
- Architectural type: neoclassical
- Groundbreaking: 1824
- Completed: 1837

Specifications
- Capacity: 1200

Administration
- Diocese: Archdiocese of Turku
- Parish: Loimaa

The Church of Loimaa Proper (Finnish: Kanta-Loimaan kirkko) is a church located in the municipality of Loimaa, Finland. It serves as the main church for the parish of Loimaa and is a visible landmark in the middle of countryside.

Today the church is regarded as a protected site by the Finnish Heritage Agency.

== History ==
A parish was founded in Loimaa somewhere around 1420's.

The church was built to its current location in 1837 and is designed by the Italian-born Carlo Bassi. The location was moved due to lack of space. Previously on the spot of the church there was a secret site for the pre-Christian pagans whose so called sacrificial stone is still visible at the church's front yard.

In 1888 the church was destroyed in a fire started by a lightning. Most of the movables, including the altarpiece, was saved. The church was rebuilt in 1892 and the architect Josef Stenbäck followed Bassi's blueprints to the best of his abilities. According to legend, a local fortune teller, Prättäkitti, foresaw the fire some 200 years before it happened.

== Altarpiece and pulpit ==
The central painting of the altarpiece stands freely on its own and is painted by R. W. Ekman in 1850. The name of the painting is called Kristus ristillä ("Christ on the Cross").

The sacristy is located behind the altarpiece and is accessible from the both sides of the alar.

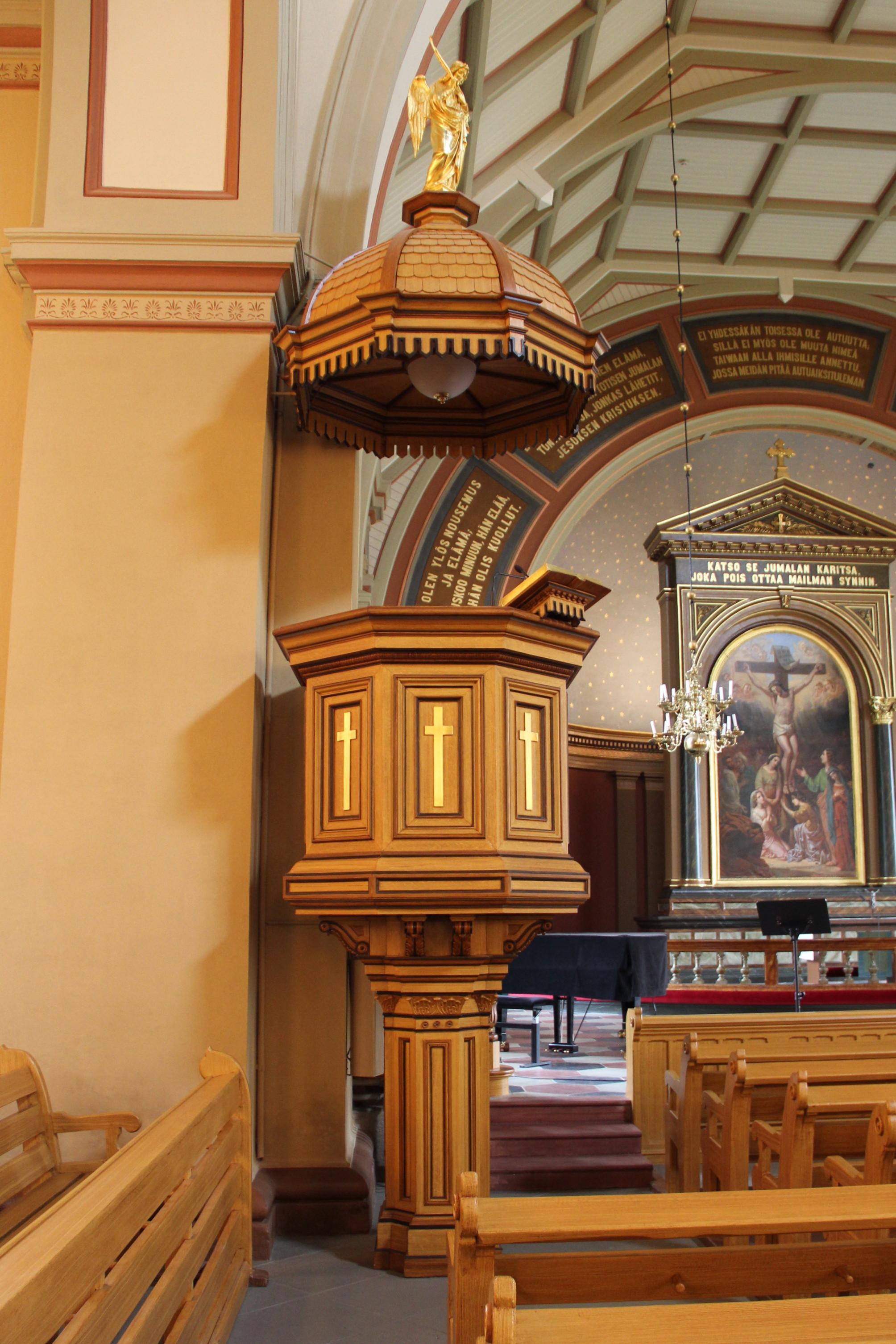
The pulpit in 2017.

The pulpit of the church is rarely used these days.

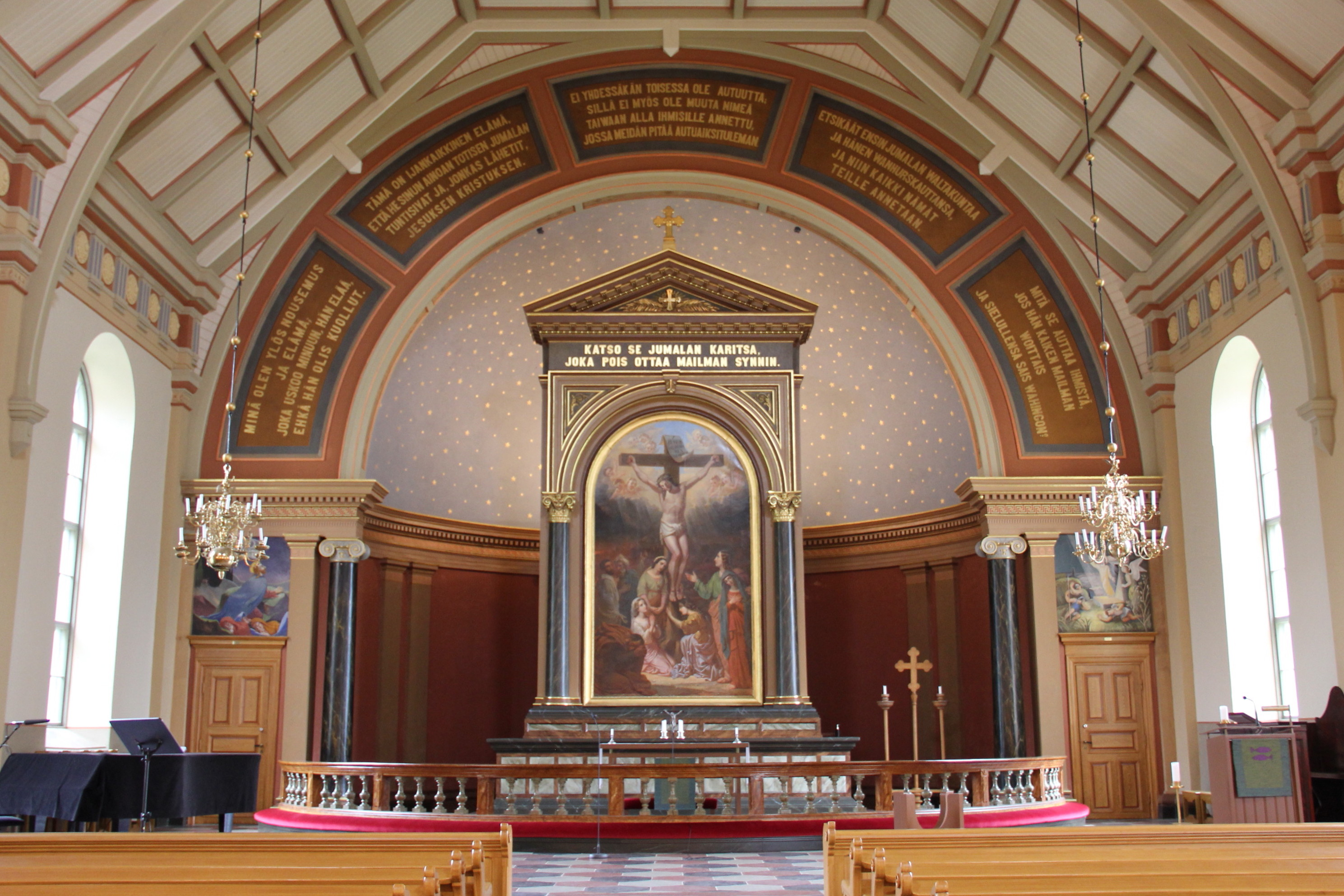
The altarpiece of the church in 2017.
