= Tetradecathlon =

Athletic track and field competition consisting of fourteen events

Athletics Tetradecathlon
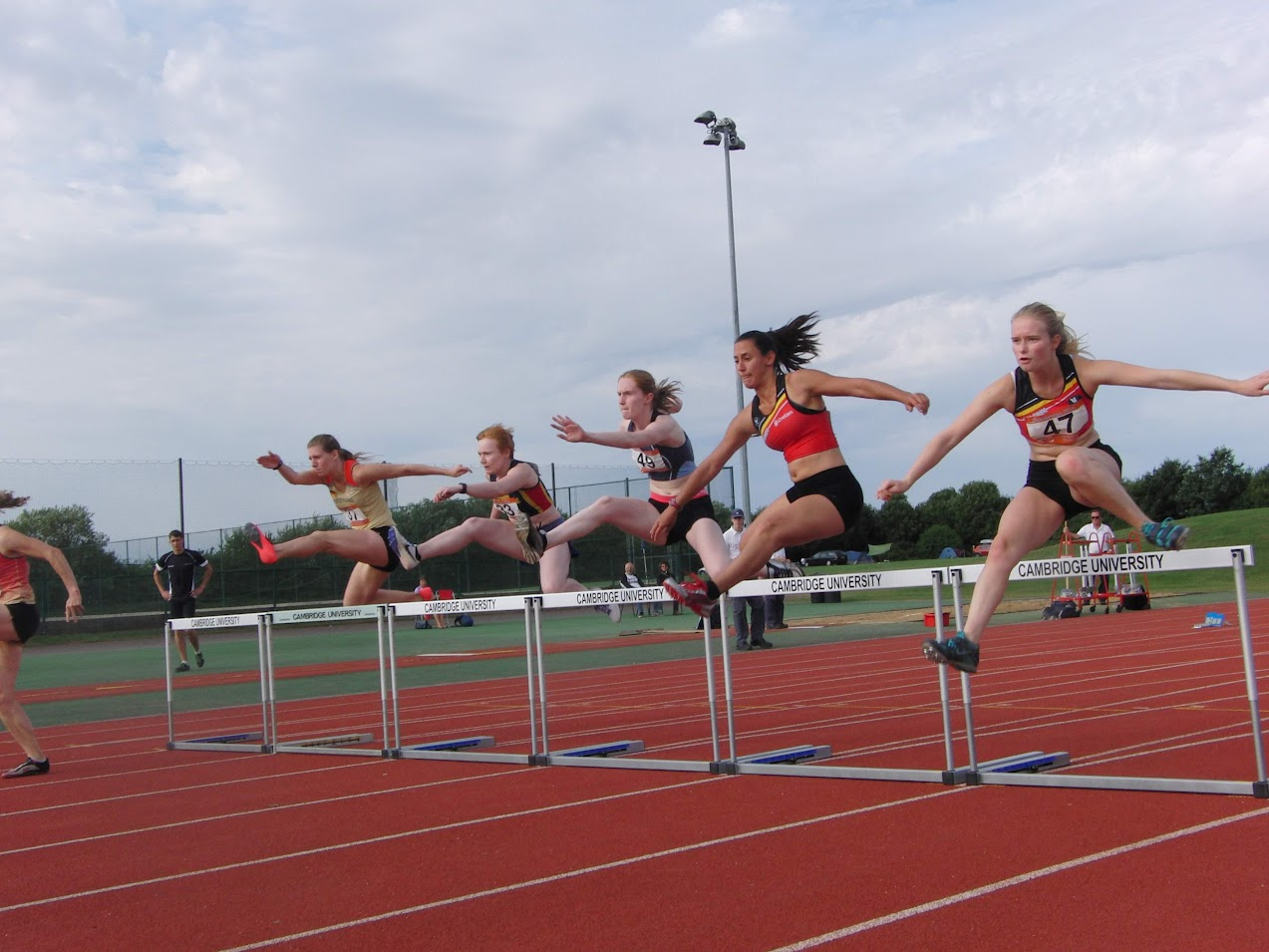
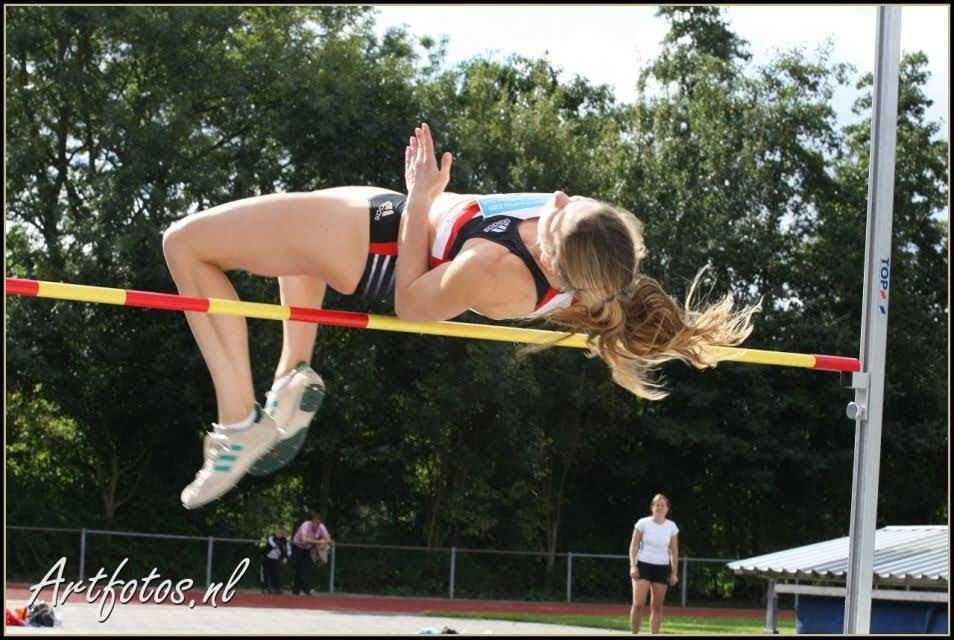
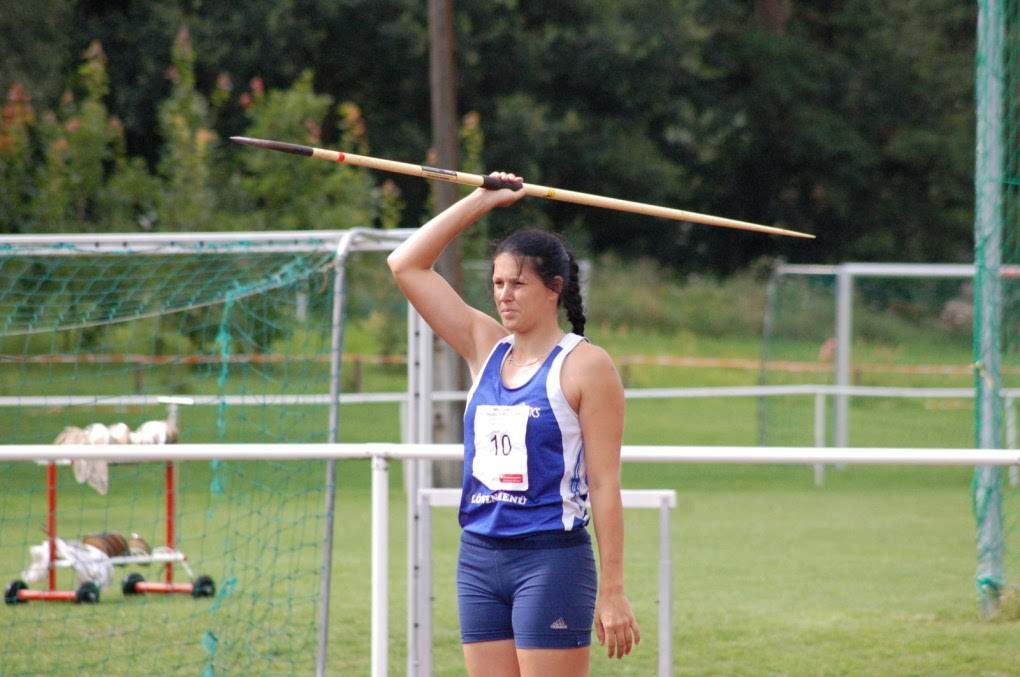
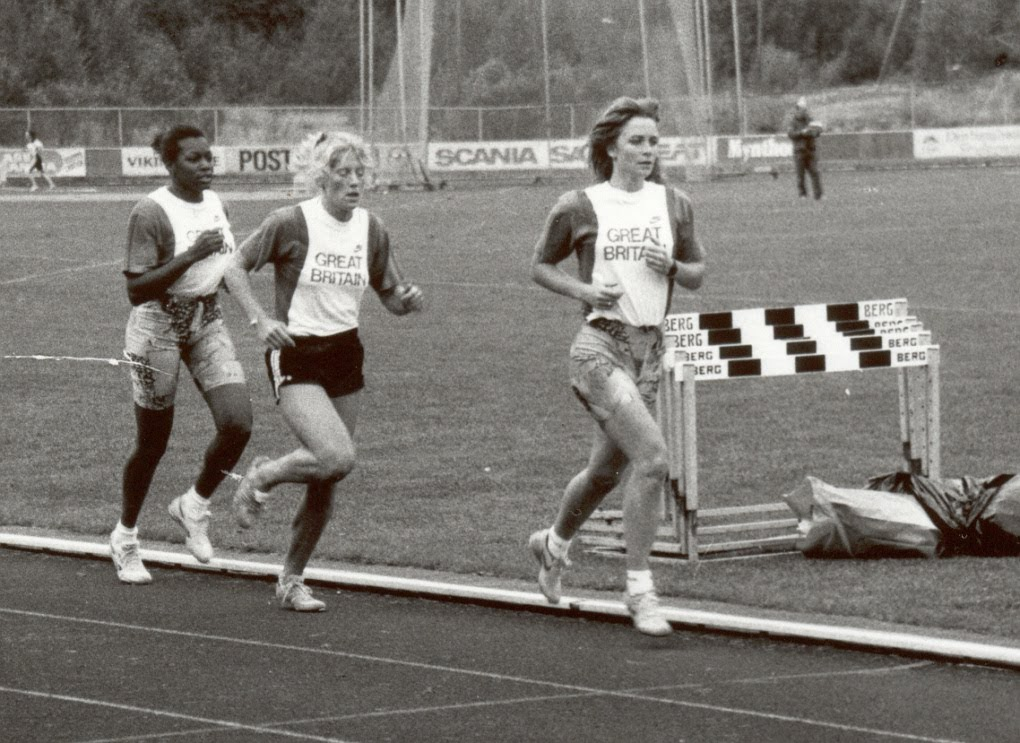
- Tetradecathlon combines nine runs, two jumps, and three throws. Outdoor world record (Finland) Kello Mila 10798 pts (2002) Indoor world record Men (France) Baptiste Scalabrino 8831 pts (2022) Women (United States) Lauren Kuntz 8390 pts (2024)

The tetradecathlon, also called double heptathlon, is an ultra combined events of track and field competition consisting of 14 events. The word "tetradecathlon" was formed, in analogy to the word "decathlon", from Greek Τετράδέκα (tetradéka, meaning "fourteen") and ἄθλος (áthlos, or ἄθλον, áthlon, meaning "contest" or "prize"). A competitor in a tetradecathlon is referred to as a tetradecathlete.

Events are held over two consecutive days and the winners are determined by the combined performance in all. Performance is judged on a points system in each event.

Outdoor competition of tetradecathlon is only contested by female athletes, while male athletes compete in the icosathlon. The International Association for Ultra Multievents (IAUM) is in charge of it and runs the World Championships for it alongside the Icosathlon. There is an indoor variant for men and women as well as a one-day variant.

== Formats ==
=== Women's outdoor tetradecathlon ===
The vast majority of women's tetradecathlons are divided into a two-day competition, with the track and field events held in the order below.

Day 1

- 100m hurdles
- High jump
- 1500m
- 400m hurdles
- Shot put
- 200m

Day 2

- 100m
- Long jump
- 400m
- Javelin
- 800m
- 200m hurdles
- Discus
- 3000m

Each event is scored according to the heptathlon scoring tables or, for non-heptathlon events, the World Athletics points tables.

=== Men and women's indoor tetradecathlon ===
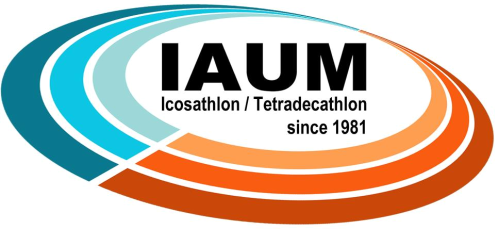
IAUM's logo.

In winter season, the ultra multi-event competitions are declined into indoor tetradecathlon for both men and women. They are also organized into a two-day competition, with the track and field events held in the order below.

Day 1

- 60m
- Long jump
- 800m
- Shot put
- 400m
- High jump
- 3000m

Day 2

- 60m hurdles
- Pole vault
- 1500m
- Weight throw
- 200m
- Triple jump
- 5000m

Each event is scored according to the pentathlon scoring tables for women and the heptathlon scoring tables for men, and for the specifics events, the World Athletics points tables. Also run by the IAUM, its world championship is held yearly starting from 2012.

== World records ==
Outdoor Tetradecathlon

- Women : 10798 points - Milla Kelo (FIN) - 2002 (Turku, Finland)

	100m H	High jump	1500m	400m H	Shot put	200m	100m	Long jump	400m	Javelin	800m	200m H	Discus	3000m	Total
Milla Kelo (FIN)	14"89	1m51	5'03"74	62"18	12m73	25"16	12"59	5m73	56"10	32m69	2'23"94	28"72	47m86	11'48"68	10798pts

Indoor Tetradecathlon

- Men : 8831 points - Baptiste Scalabrino (FRA) - 2022 (Miramas, France)
- Women : 8554 points - Elea Aubert (FRA) - 2026 (Helsinki, Finland)

	60m	Long jump	800m	Shot put	400m	High jump	3000m	60m H	Pole vault	1500m	Weight throw	200m	Triple jump	5000m	Total
Baptiste Scalabrino (FRA)	7"80	6m53	2'04"76	11m93	53"80	1m83	9'57"43	9"19	3m80	4'35"91	10m12	25"11	12m30	17'59"55	8831pts
Elea Aubert (FRA)	8"29	5m08	2'27"00	9m19	61"26	1m51	12'23"85	9"25	2m60	5'29"96	10m45	27"08	11m47	22'27"04	8554pts

This table of records is not officially acknowledged by the World Athletics but is considered by the International Association for Ultra Multievents (IAUM) as the best performance of all time since the foundation of the discipline in 1981.

== Area records (outdoor) ==
Continent	Score	Athlete	Date	Place
Europe	10798	Milla Kelo	7–8 September 2002	Turku, Finland
North America	9824	Natalia Gaerlan	2–3 August 2008	Scheeßel, Germany
Asia	5392	Takahashi Fumie	13–14 August 2005	Aomori, Japan
Africa	–			
Oceania	–			
South America	–			

== National records (outdoor) ==
Country	Score
Finland	10798
Russia	10732
Germany	10380
United States	9824
Estonia	9755
Lithuania	9612
United Kingdom	9152
Netherlands	8779
Belgium	8758
France	8552
Italy	8533
Austria	8478
Switzerland	7897
Sweden	7052
Japan	5392

== World Championships (outdoor) ==
Edition	Year	City	Country	Date	Winner	Score
1st	1990	Espoo	Finland	22–23 September	Charmaine Johnson (GBR)	9152
2nd	1991	Punkalaidun	Finland	21–22 September	Irina Stasenko (RUS)	9879
3rd	1992	Punkalaidun	Finland	12–13 September	Irina Stasenko (RUS)	10732
4th	1993	Punkalaidun	Finland	11–12 September	Irina Stasenko (RUS)	10513
5th	1994	Punkalaidun	Finland	10–11 September	Irina Stasenko (RUS)	10586
6th	1995	Punkalaidun	Finland	9–10 September	Susanna Hickman (FIN)	7731
7th	1996	Punkalaidun	Finland	7–8 September	Maria Kapitonova (RUS)	9915
8th	1997	Punkalaidun	Finland	6–7 September	Anga Tognotti (DEU)	8021
9th	1998	Punkalaidun	Finland	5–6 September	Maria Kapitonova (RUS)	9935
10th	1999	Punkalaidun	Finland	4–5 September	Irina Ilyna (RUS)	10033
11th	2000	Hexham	United Kingdom	23–24 September	Jacqueline Elliott (GBR)	7733
12th	2001	Hexham	United Kingdom	22–23 September	Irina Ilyna (RUS)	10286
13th	2002	Turku	Finland	7–8 September	Milla Kelo (FIN)	10798
14th	2003	Sankt Pölten	Austria	4–5 October	Irina Ilyna (RUS)	9534
15th	2004	Gateshead	United Kingdom	21–22 August	Kelly Rodmell (GBR)	7978
16th	2005	Lynchburg, Virginia	United States	7–8 October	Ashley Palmer (USA)	6645
17th	2006	Bendigo	Australia	14–15 October	Antje Bock (DEU)	6605
18th	2007	Jyväskylä	Finland	25–26 August	Kelly Rodmell (GBR)	8601
19th	2008	Scheeßel	Germany	2–3 August	Natalia Gaerlan (USA)	9824
20th	2009	Delft	Netherlands	12–13 September	Maren Schott (DEU)	10380
21st	2010	Lynchburg, Virginia	United States	24–25 September	Marie Williams (USA)	7775
22nd	2011	Lisse	Netherlands	20–21 August	Sonja Beba (DEU)	7744
23rd	2012	Turnhout	Belgium	30 June – 1 July	Evy De Jaegher (BEL)	7361
24th	2013	Yeovil	United Kingdom	24–25 August	Maren Schott (DEU)	8889
25th	2015	Tartu	Estonia	22–23 August	Maren Schott (DEU)	9338
26th	2017	Turnhout	Belgium	26–27 August	Maren Schott (DEU)	8934
27th	2018	Delft	Netherlands	25–26 August	Saskia Zwaard (NED)	7264
28th	2019	Helsinki	Finland	24–25 August	Jill de Gier (NED)	6845
29th	2021	Épinal	France	21–22 August	Fiona Espagnet (FRA)	8552
30th	2023	Turnhout	Belgium	8–9 July	Stephanie Brosens (BEL)	8758
31st	2025	Besancon	France	12–13 July	Elea Aubert (FRA)	8820

== World Championships (indoor) ==
Edition	Year	City	Country	Date	Winner	Score
1st	2012	Helsinki	Finland	14–15 April	♂ Etienne Bouden (FRA)	8118
1st	2012	Helsinki	Finland	14–15 April	♀ Matleena Helander (FIN)	5054
2nd	2014	Helsinki	Finland	12–13 April	♂ Joey Blangé (NED)	7592
2nd	2014	Helsinki	Finland	12–13 April	♀ Matleena Helander (FIN)	5205
3rd	2016	Helsinki	Finland	9–10 April	♂ Andreas Schewalje (GER)	8144
3rd	2016	Helsinki	Finland	9–10 April	♀ Maren Schott (GER)|	7929
4th	2018	Helsinki	Finland	14–15 April	♂ Sébastien Biau (FRA)	8478
4th	2018	Helsinki	Finland	14–15 April	♀ Linda Holmström (SWE)	6223
5th	2022	Miramas	France	26–27 March	♂ Baptiste Scalabrino (FRA)	8831
5th	2022	Miramas	France	26–27 March	♀ Amanda Pasko (USA)	6970
6th	2024	Boston	United States	16–17 March	♂ Adriano Atallah (LBN)	7513
6th	2024	Boston	United States	16–17 March	♀ Lauren Kuntz (USA)	8388
7th	2026	Helsinki	Finland	11–12 April	♂ Hugo Sisternes (FRA)	8015
7th	2026	Helsinki	Finland	11–12 April	♀ Elea Aubert (FRA)	8554

== Other IAUM events ==
- Icosathlon
