= Sarka (museum) =

Museum in Loimaa, Finland

Coordinates: 60.8340°N 22.9875°E

- Suomen maatalousmuseo Sarka
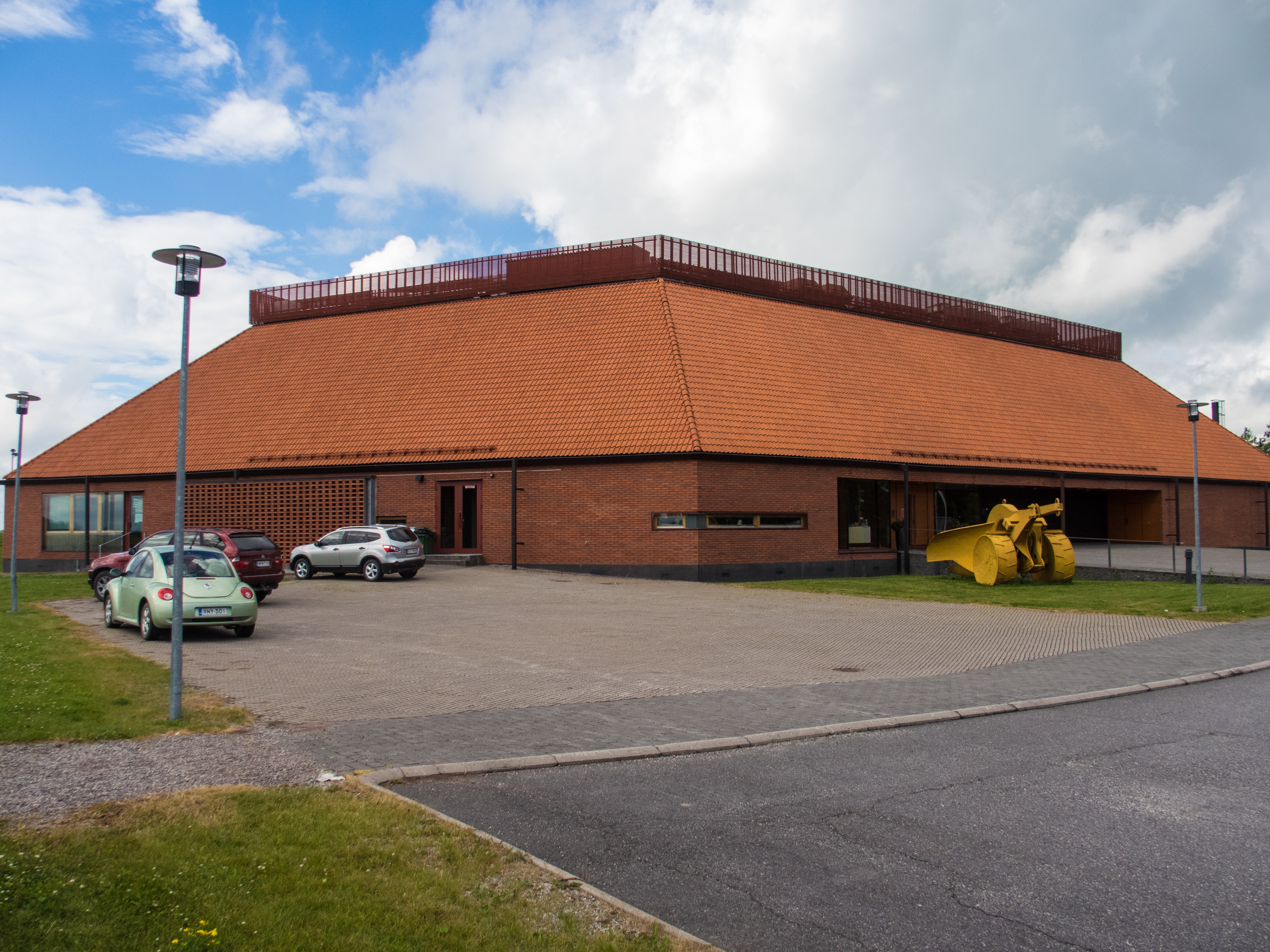
- Established: June 1, 2005
- Location: Loimaa, Finland
- Type: Agriculture; Agricultural history
- Director: Sami Louekari
- Owner: State of Finland
- Employees: 17
- Website: https://www.sarka.fi/in-english/

Sarka is an agricultural museum located in Loimaa, Southwest Finland. The name of the museum comes from a Finnish word meaning a strip of field.

The first discussion on the need for a local museum of agriculture started as early as in the 1940s. The Finnish Ministry of Education took the museum under its wing in 1985 and in 2003 the official decision was made.

Sarka revolves around the history of the agriculture in Finland and the museum presents 3000 years of history. The two main exhibitions are called The Age of Agriculture and Before Machines. Additionally there's an exhibition called Powered by Machines.

Since 2019 the director of the museum has been Sami Louekari (PhD) as the previous director retired.

Aside from the museum, there's also a restaurant that serves lunch and à la carte.
