= Mellilä =

Coordinates: 60°46′45″N 22°55′30″E

- Former municipality
- Mellilän kunta Mellilä kommun
- Coat of arms

- Country: Finland
- Province: Western Finland
- Region: Southwest Finland
- Sub-region: Loimaa
- Merged with Loimaa: January 1, 2009

Government
  - City manager: Esko Rautiainen

Area
  - Total: 110.62 km^{2} (42.71 sq mi)
  - Land: 110.52 km^{2} (42.67 sq mi)
  - Water: 0.1 km^{2} (0.039 sq mi)
  - Rank: 387th

Population (2003)
  - Total: 1,252
  - Rank: 401st
  - Density: 11.33/km^{2} (29.34/sq mi)
- +2.4 % change
- Time zone: UTC+2 (EET)
  - Summer (DST): UTC+3 (EEST)
- Official languages: Finnish
- Urbanisation: 44.5%
- Unemployment rate: 9.2%
- Climate: Dfc

Mellilä (Finnish pronunciation: [ˈmelːilæ]) is a former municipality of Finland. It was merged to the town of Loimaa on 1 January 2009.

It is located in the province of Western Finland and is part of the Southwest Finland region. The municipality had a population of 1,255 (2004-12-31) and covered an area of 110.62 km^{2} of which 0.10 km^{2} is water. The population density was 11.35 inhabitants per km^{2}.

The municipality was unilingually Finnish.

== Gallery ==
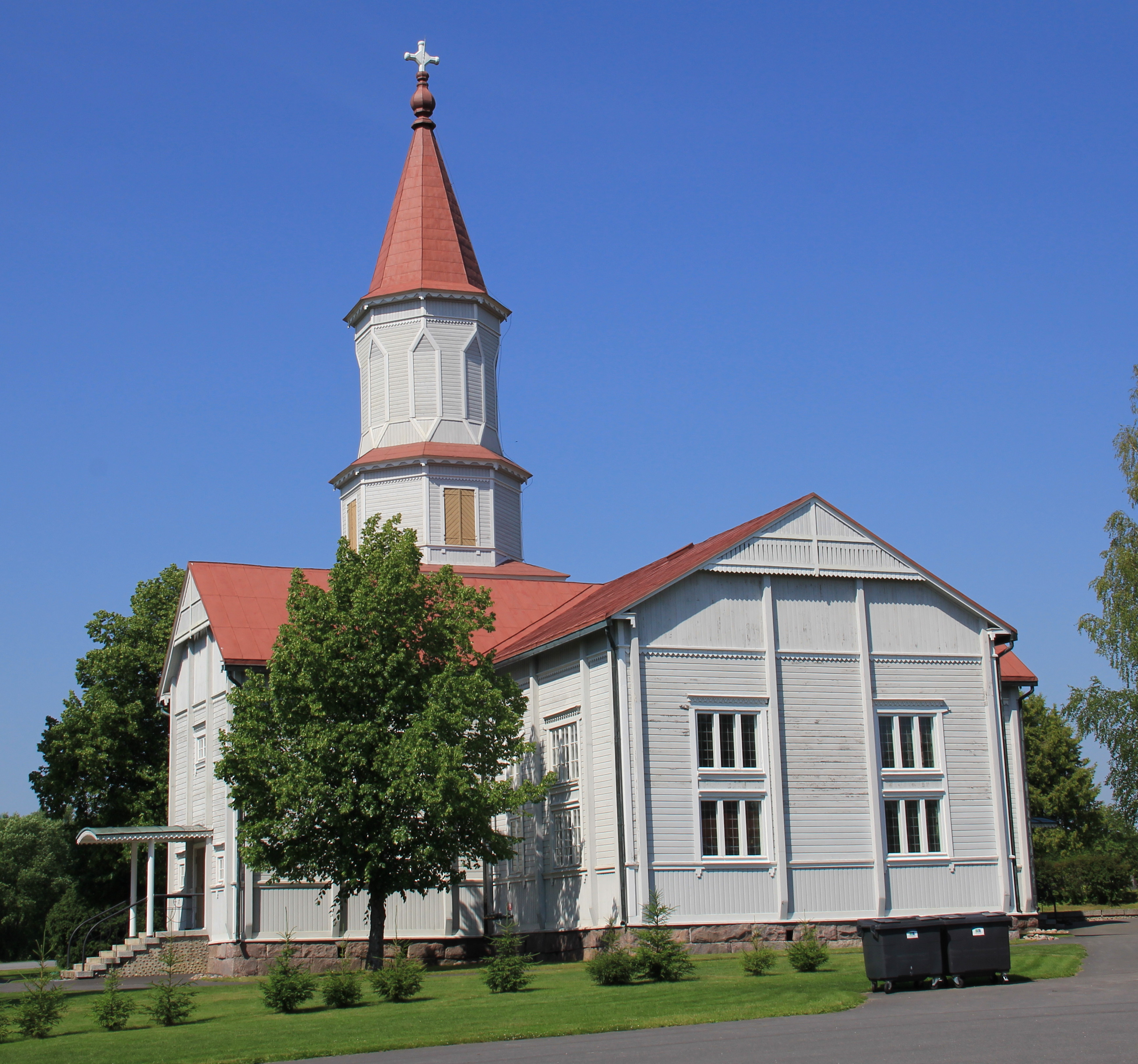
Mellilä's church

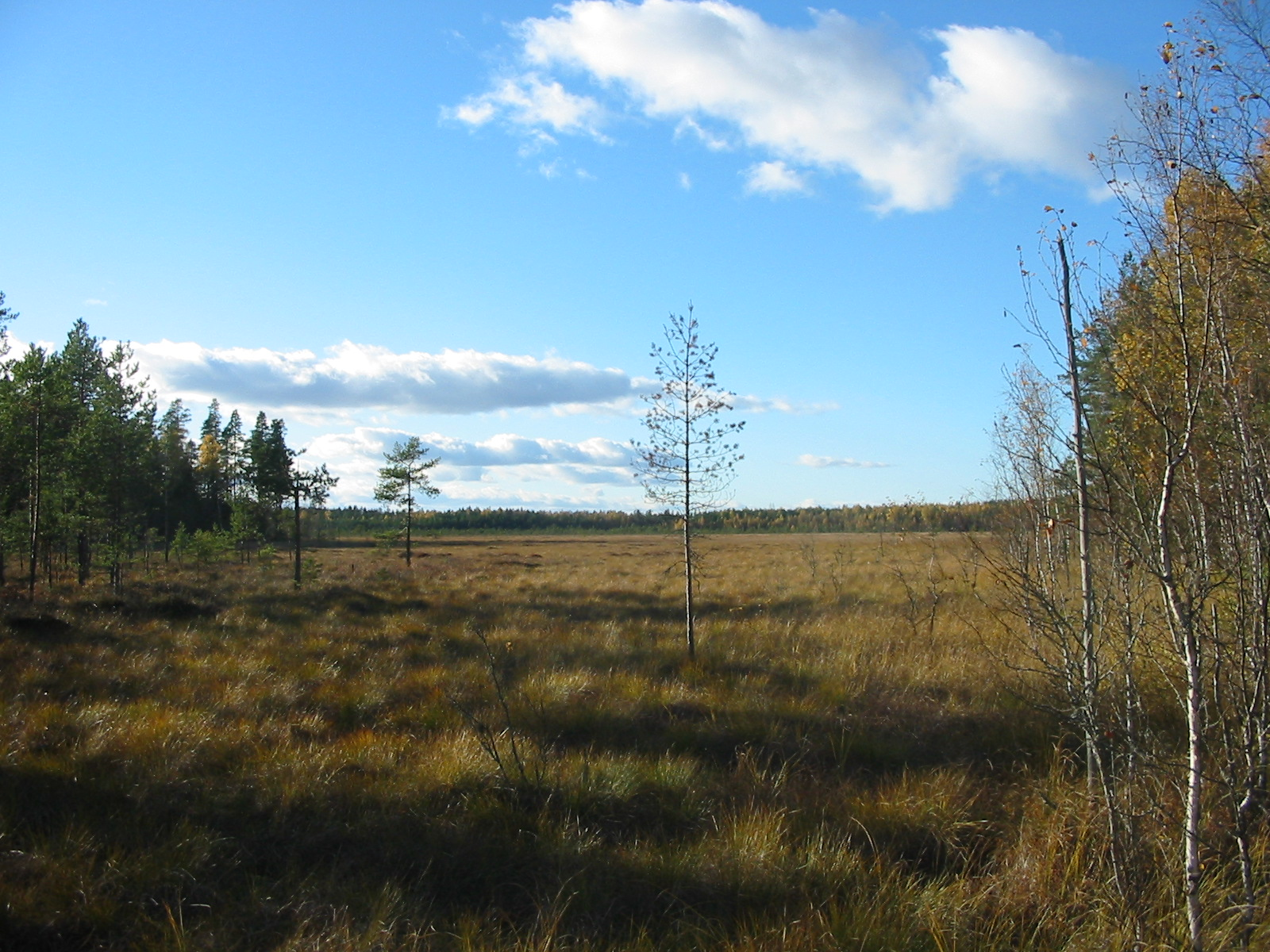
Eksyssuo

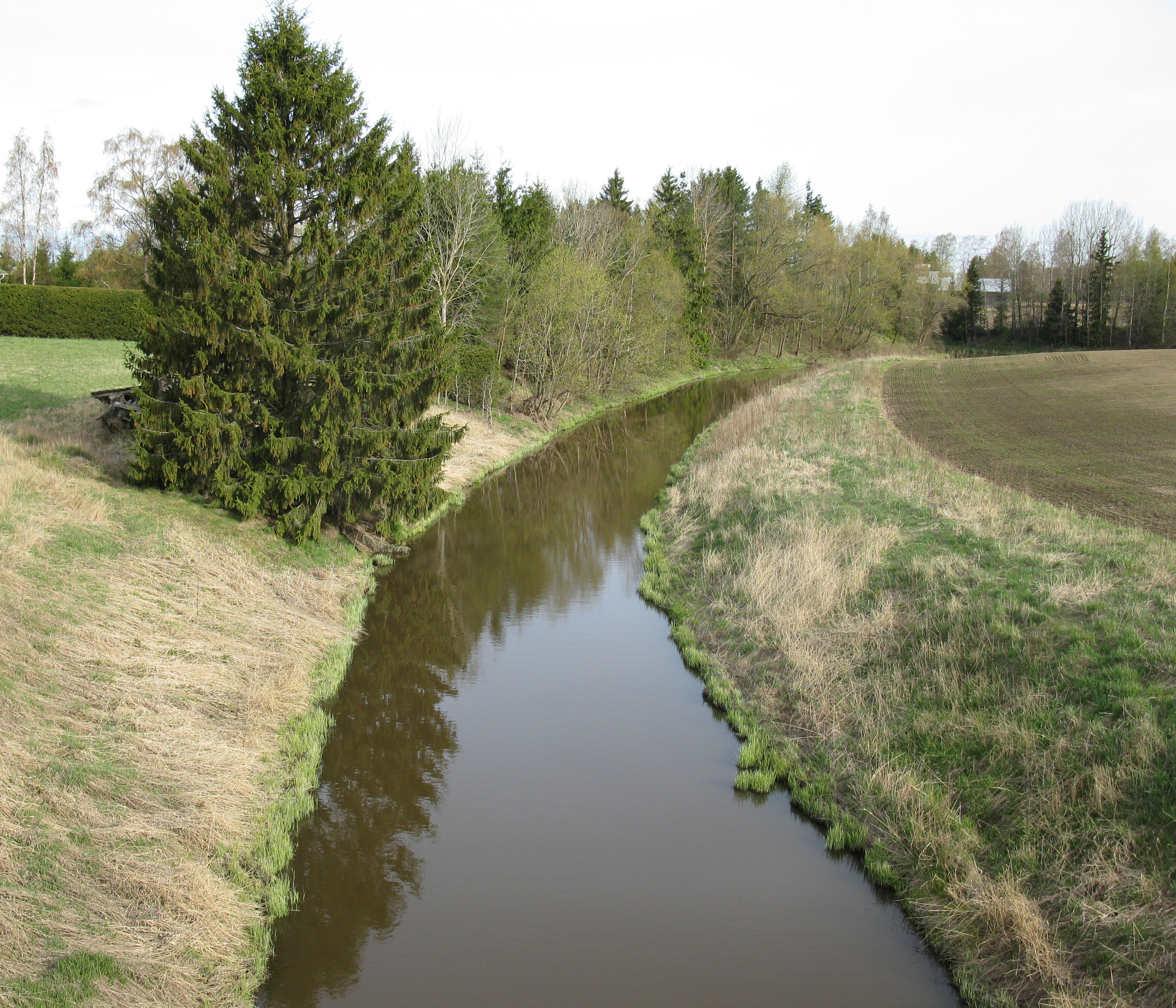
Niinijoki
