= Prättäkitti =

Prättäkitti (also Rättäkitti) was a Finnish fortune teller or a witch from the household of Manninen, Loimaa (present day Ypäjä). Prättäkitti's magical powers are said to come from the fact that when she was born, the person acting as the midwife was a witch herself.

== Biography ==
Virtually everything about the life of Prättäkitti is unverifiable and open to debate. It is suspected that she lived somewhere in the 17th century but she has also been connected to Ulriikka Justiina, a housewife in the same household in the 19th century.

It is said that she was originally from Nousiainen. According to one story, a land-owning farmer, Teppo from Manninen, saw her rowing a boat while visiting Turku and decided to ask her hand in marriage.

== Prophecies and alleged witchcraft ==
There are multiple stories about the fortune telling abilities of Prättäkitti. Moreover, she is said to have wielded witchcraft and according to one story, trialed for that too.

Some popular things Prättäkitti is said to have prophesied include

- The burning of the church of Loimaa Proper in 1888: Prättäkitti is rumoured to have said that the church will stand for 50 years and then burn down.
- "The belting of the world with an iron belt": aka the railway. She also foresaw that it will be used by "an iron carriage with no horse pulling it" aka the train.
- The urbanisation of Välimetsä, Peltoinen: this area was generally uninhabited until the construction Turku–Toijala railway was completed in 1876.

=== Bewitching boy into wolf ===
One popular story goes that the housewife from Pytty household went to Prättäkitti and told her that someone had stolen money from her. She asked if it would be possible to cast a spell and turn the thief into a wolf. Prättäkitti obliged. When the woman got home she found out that it was her own son, Yrjä, who had stolen the money and had now been turned into wolf. Some claim that the boy was turned back to human but was left with a stub of a tail, which made it painful for him to ever sit properly again.

In 2016 the musical theatre of Ypäjä made a children's play (script: Matti Mali, director: Jaakko Loukkola) based on this story. In it the story takes place between 1650–1657.

=== Prättäkitti and milling stone ===
There are two stories about how Prättäkitti used a milling stone to cross a river.

The first one states that Prättäkitti and her son did not have any means of crossing the river Loimijoki until they spotted an old milling stone. Prättäkitti instructed the son not to watch behind her back while crossing the river or else a great harm will befall him. The son ended up watching and went down to the river with the stone drowning.

The second story states that Prättäkitti had been trialed for practicing witchcraft and sentenced to be drowned with a milling stone. Once she was thrown into a lake, she did not sink but sailed to the opposing shore on top of the stone.

=== Burial ===
There are several accounts on Prättäkitti's death and burial. A recurring theme is that the coffin was very heavy. One story states that when the people looked into the coffin, they found a snake there. Other say that the coffin flew into a tree.

== Prättäkitti tradition ==
In 1981 a radio drama was produced about Prättäkitti scripted by Pirkko Jaakola.

An annual Prättäkitti Day (Finnish Prättäkittipäivä) is celebrated in Loimaa at the end of February or the beginning of March. It is organised by the businesswomen's organisation in Loimaa and local newspaper Loimaan Lehti. During the day one of the organising business owner is selected to dress up as a witch and the businesses offer a bargain sale.
