= Icosathlon =

Athletic track and field competition consisting of twenty events

Athletics Icosathlon
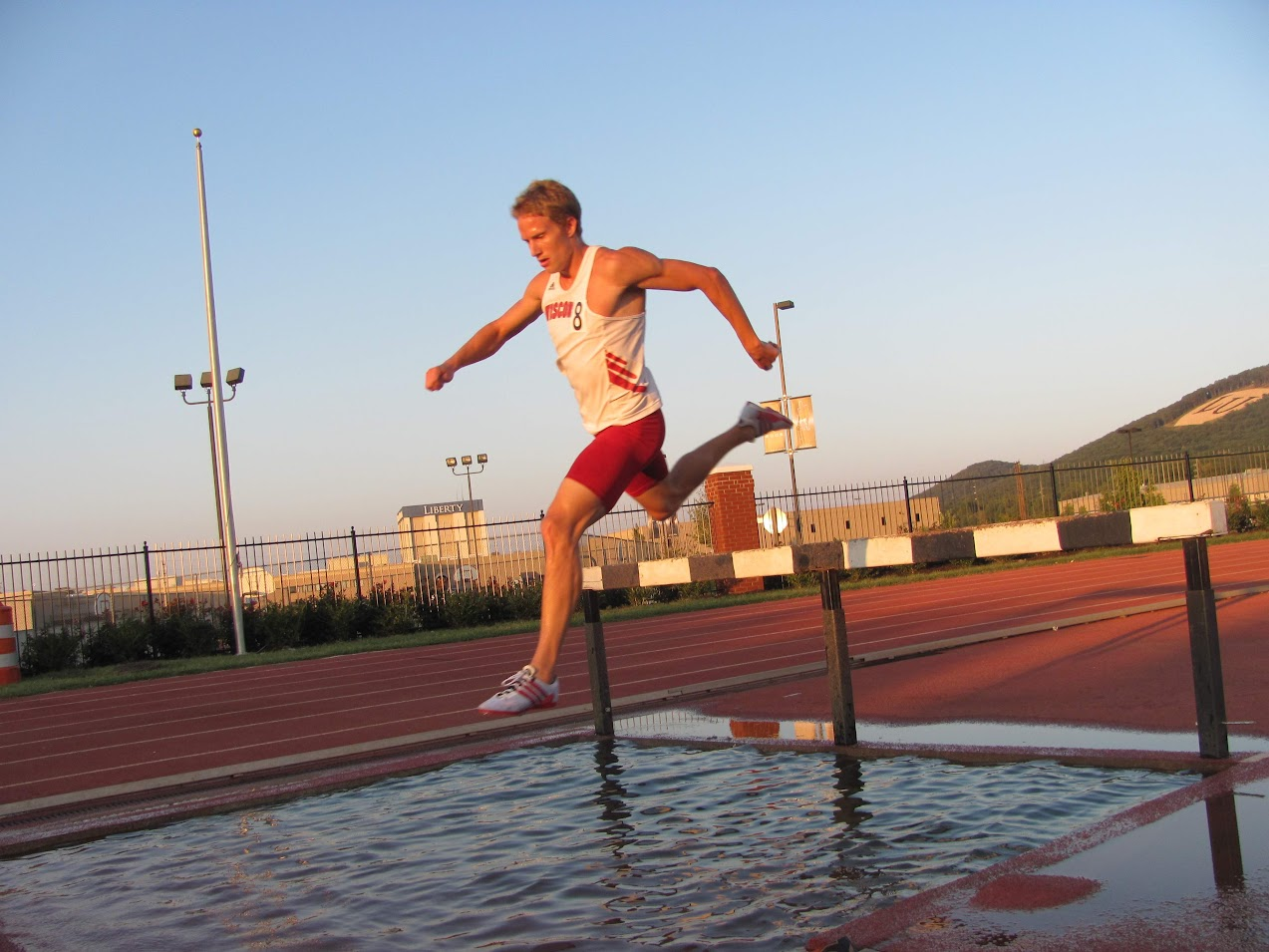
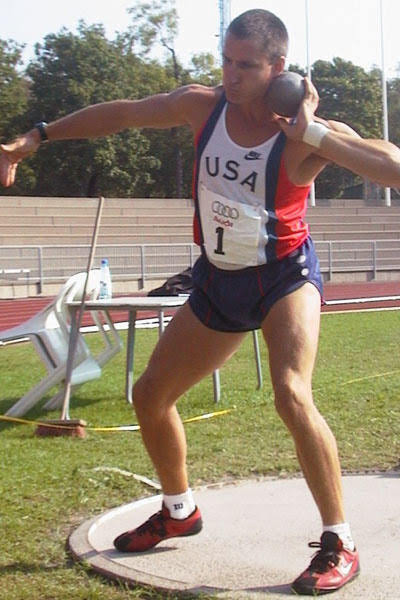
- Joseph Detmer on 3000m steeple in Lynchburg (2010) Kip Janvrin on the shotput event in Turku (2002) Icosathlon combines twelve runs, four jumps, and four throws.

World records
- Men: (United States) Joseph Detmer 14571 pts (2010)
- Women: (United States) Lauren Kuntz 11653 pts (2023)

The icosathlon, also called double decathlon, is an ultra combined events of track and field competition consisting of 20 events. The word "icosathlon" was formed, in analogy to the word "decathlon", from Greek εἴκοσι (eíkosi, meaning "twenty") and ἄθλος (áthlos, or ἄθλον, áthlon, meaning "contest" or “prize”).
A competitor in an isocathlon is referred to as an isocathlete.

Events are held over two consecutive days and the winners are determined by the combined performance in all. Performance is judged on a points system in each event, not by the position achieved.

The icosathlon is contested mainly by male athletes, while female athletes mostly compete in the tetradecathlon. The event is overseen by the International Association for Ultra Multievents (IAUM), which also holds the tetradecathlon based on the women's heptathlon.

The men's world record for the standard icosathlon of 14,571 is held by Joseph Detmer of the United States. The women's world record of 11,653 is held by Lauren Kuntz from the United States.

== Format ==
=== Men's icosathlon ===
The vast majority of men's icosathlons are divided into a two-day competition, with the track and field events held in the order below.

Day 1

- 100 metres
- Long jump
- 200 metres hurdles
- Shot put
- 5000 metres
- pause of 1 hour
- 800 metres
- High jump
- 400 metres
- Hammer throw
- 3000 metres steeplechase

Day 2

- 110 metres hurdles
- Discus throw
- 200 metres
- Pole vault
- 3000 metres
- pause of 1 hour
- 400 metres hurdles
- Javelin throw
- 1500 metres
- Triple jump
- 10000 metres

Each event is scored according to the decathlon scoring tables or, for non-decathlon events, the World Athletics points tables. At the conclusion of each icosathlon, the competitor with the highest point total is declared the winner.

=== Women's icosathlon ===
At major championships, the women's equivalent of the icosathlon is the fourteen-event tetradecathlon. Women's disciplines differ from men's in the same way as for standalone events: the shot, hammer, discus and javelin weigh less, and the sprint hurdles use lower hurdles over 100 m rather than 110 m, over 400m hurdles and 3000m steeple. The points tables used are the same as for the heptathlon and women's decathlon in the shared events. The schedule of events is identical to the men's icosathlon.

=== One day icosathlon ===
One-day icosathlons also exist, with the same program of events succeeding each other more quickly, but respecting the one hour pause of midday between the 3000m steeple and the 110m hurdles.

The world record holder is the Belgian athlete Frederic Xhonneux, who achieved 12,363 points at a meeting in Heiloo, Netherlands, the 27th of June 2015.

As a woman, the British athlete Kelly Rodmell established the best performance of all-time with 10,275 points at a meeting in Helsinki, Finland, the 25th of May 2005.

=== Masters athletics ===
In Masters athletics, performance scores are age graded before being applied to the standard scoring table. This way, marks that would be competitive within an age division can get rated, even if those marks would not appear on the scale designed for younger age groups. Additionally, like women, the age divisions use different implement weights and lower hurdles. Based on this system, American Kip Janvrin in the M35 division has set his score at 14,793 points.

== World records ==
Men

- Icosathlon : 14571 points – Joseph Detmer (USA) – 2010 (Lynchburg, USA)

Women

- Icosathlon : 11653 points – Lauren Kuntz (USA) – 2023 (Pittsburgh, Pennsylvania, USA)

World records details
Day 1		100m	Long jump	200m H	Shot put	5000m	800m	High jump	400m	Hammer throw	3000m SC	
Joseph Detmer (USA)	♂	10.93	7.30m	24.25	12.27m	18:25.32	2:02.23	1.98m	50.43	31.82m	11:22.47	–
Lauren Kuntz (USA)	♀	13.55	4.82m	30.27	8.36m	20:45.64	2:24.64	1.49m	61.37	24.18m	12:48.28	–
Day 2		110m H	Discus throw	200m	Pole vault	3000m	400m H	Javelin throw	1500m	Triple jump	10000m	Total
Joseph Detmer (USA)	♂	15.01	40.73m	22.58	4.85m	10:25.49	53.83	51.95m	4:26.66	13.67m	40:27.26	14571 pts
Lauren Kuntz (USA)	♀	16.23	23.46m	28.35	3.50m	11:39.05	70.16	20.71m	5:22.77	9.91m	46:26.39	11653 pts

This table of records is not officially acknowledged by the World Athletics but is considered by the International Association for Ultra Multievents (IAUM) as the best performance of all time since the foundation of the discipline in 1981.

== Area records ==
Continent	Score	Athlete	Date	Place
North America	14571	Joseph Detmer	25–26 September 2010	Lynchburg, USA
Europe	13906	Indrek Kaseorg	12–13 September 1992	Turku, Finland
Asia	12393	Kouki Someya	11–12 October 2014	Katsuura, Japan
Oceania	12088	David Purdon	4–5 June 2005	Vienna, Austria
Africa	11014	Seck Leyti	7–8 October 2005	Lynchburg, USA
South America	–			

== World Championships ==
Edition	Year	City	Country	Date	Winner	Score
1st	1990	Espoo	Finland	22–23 September	Indrek Kaseorg (EST)	13213
2nd	1991	Punkalaidun	Finland	21–22 September	Indrek Kaseorg (EST)	14086
3rd	1992	Punkalaidun	Finland	12–13 September	Indrek Kaseorg (EST)	14274
4th	1993	Punkalaidun	Finland	11–12 September	Pasi Suutarinen (FIN)	12509
5th	1994	Punkalaidun	Finland	10–11 September	Pasi Suutarinen (FIN)	12378
6th	1995	Punkalaidun	Finland	9–10 September	Aivar Hommik (EST)	12023
7th	1996	Punkalaidun	Finland	7–8 September	Aivar Hommik (EST)	12111
8th	1997	Punkalaidun	Finland	6–7 September	Teppo Syrjala (FIN)	11774
9th	1998	Punkalaidun	Finland	5–6 September	Teppo Syrjala (FIN)	11929
10th	1999	Punkalaidun	Finland	4–5 September	Meelis Tammre (EST)	11722
11th	2000	Hexham	United Kingdom	23–24 September	John Heanley (GBR)	12409
12th	2001	Hexham	United Kingdom	22–23 September	David Purdon (AUS)	11275
13th	2002	Turku	Finland	7–8 September	Kip Janvrin (USA)	14185
14th	2003	Sankt Pölten	Austria	4–5 October	Brauer Päärn (EST)	11672
15th	2004	Gateshead	United Kingdom	21–22 August	Shaun Meinecke (USA)	12784
16th	2005	Lynchburg, Virginia	United States	7–8 October	David Purdon (AUS)	11682
17th	2006	Bendigo	Australia	14–15 October	David Purdon (AUS)	11931
18th	2007	Jyväskylä	Finland	25–26 August	Marnix Engels (NED)	12004
19th	2008	Scheeßel	Germany	2–3 August	Schürmann Adrian (DEU)	11877
20th	2009	Delft	Netherlands	12–13 September	Benedikt Nolte (DEU)	11605
21st	2010	Lynchburg, Virginia	United States	24–25 September	Joe Detmer (USA)	14571
22nd	2011	Lisse	Netherlands	20–21 August	Joan Estruch (ESP)	10824
23rd	2012	Turnhout	Belgium	30 June – 1 July	Bert Misplon (BEL)	11316
24th	2013	Yeovil	United Kingdom	24–25 August	Rob Simmonds (GBR)	11550
EC	2014	Lodi	Italy	6–7 September	Alastair Stanley (GBR)	12196
WI	2014	Delft	Netherlands	13–14 September	Frédéric Xhonneux (BEL)	13099
25th	2015	Tartu	Estonia	22–23 August	Roberto James Paoluzzi (ITA)	11763
EC	2016	Cambridge	United Kingdom	27–28 August	Alastair Stanley (GBR)	11464
WI	2016	Delft	Netherlands	10–11 September	Florian Herr (GER)	10729
26th	2017	Turnhout	Belgium	26–27 August	Alastair Stanley (GBR) (U23)	11769
26th	2017	Turnhout	Belgium	26–27 August	Bert Misplon (BEL)	11356
27th	2018	Delft	Netherlands	25–26 August	Alastair Stanley (GBR)	11981
28th	2019	Helsinki	Finland	24–25 August	Florian Herr (GER)	10101
29th*	2021	Épinal	France	21–22 August	Arnaud Ghislain (BEL)	11342
29th*	2021	Épinal	France	21–22 August	Lauren Kuntz (USA)	10941
WI	2022	Delft	Netherlands	10–11 September	Ruben Harmsen (NED)	8822
WI	2022	Delft	Netherlands	10–11 September	Amanda Pasko (USA)	10148
30th	2023	Turnhout	Belgium	8–9 July	Baptiste Scalabrino (FRA)	12042
WI^{+}	2023	Pittsburgh, Pennsylvania	United States	22–23 July	Lauren Kuntz (USA)	11653
WI	2024	Geneva, Ohio	United States	3-4 August	John Ethan Baldwin (USA)	9790
WI	2024	Geneva, Ohio	United States	3-4 August	Shura Ermakov (USA)	10587
31st	2025	Besancon	France	12-13 July	Nicola Riccardo (ITA)	11984
31st	2025	Besancon	France	12-13 July	Lauren Kuntz (USA)	10634
WI	2026	Delft	Netherlands	19-20 September	Tijn Pronk (NED)	9475
WI	2026	Delft	Netherlands	19-20 September	Amanda Pasko (USA)	10851

EC – European Championships (non-World Championship year)

WI – World Invitational (non-World Championship year)

* Inaugural Icosathlon World Championship for Women

+ In response to women being barred from competition at the 30th World Championships, an additional invitational event, "Ico For All", was organized.

== World Championship medal totals ==
Rank	Nation	Gold	Silver	Bronze	Total
1	Estonia	7	7	3	17
2	Finland	4	2	5	11
3	Great Britain	3	4	4	11
4	United States	3	4	2	9
5	Germany	3	3	6	12
6	Australia	3	1	1	5
7	Belgium	3	0	2	5
8	Netherlands	1	4	4	9
9	France	1	3	2	6
10	Italy	1	0	0	1
10	Spain	1	0	0	1
12	Russia	0	1	0	1
12	Sweden	0	1	0	1
14	Senegal	0	0	1	1
Totals (14 entries)		30	30	30	90

NOTE: Only medal totals for senior men since 1990.

== Indoor equivalent ==
For indoor ultra-multievent meetings, all competitors compete in an indoor tetradecathlon, spanning 14 events over 2 days. Unlike in outdoor ultra multi event competitions, the number and order of events is the same for both genders.

== Competitions ==
The IAUM sponsors an icosathlon and tetradecathlon every year at the IAUM World Championships. The 2012 World Championships were held in Turnhout, Belgium. In addition, a variety of other icosathlon events are held, most notably the annual Dutch Double Decathlon, held in Delft, Netherlands. The 2015 event was held 19–20 September. The 5th European Championships were held on 6 and 7 September 2014 in Lodi, Lombardy, Italy (near Milan). The last European Championships was held the 27–28 August 2016 in Cambridge, England. The 2017 event was held in Turnhout, Belgium and 2018 in Delft, Netherlands. The 2021 World championship (29th) was held for the first time in France in Épinal. The last World championship (30th) was held again in Turnhout, Belgium, the 8–9 July 2023.
