= Kip Janvrin =

American decathlete (born 1965)

Personal information
- Born: July 8, 1965 (age 61) Guthrie Center, Iowa, U.S.
Medal record
Men's athletics (track and field)
Representing United States
Pan American Games
Gold medal – first place	1995 Mar del Plata	Decathlon

Kip Janvrin (born July 8, 1965 in Guthrie Center, Iowa) is an American former decathlete. Janvrin is a native of Panora, Iowa and is now the Co-Head Track & Field Coach at the University of Central Missouri in Warrensburg, Missouri.

== College career ==
Janvrin is a 1988 graduate of Simpson College, an NCAA Division III school in Indianola, Iowa. He won three NCAA Division III titles in the decathlon, as well as individual titles in the pole vault and 400 meter hurdles. He was also an NCAA Division I All-American, placing 8th in the decathlon at the 1988 NCAA Division I Outdoor Track and Field Championships.

== International career ==
Janvrin won the decathlon at the 1989 Olympic Festival with 7,863 points held at Memorial Stadium in Norman, Oklahoma. Former President Ronald Reagan attended the event and spoke at the opening ceremony. Janvrin took the bronze medal at the 1994 Goodwill Games and won the 1995 Pan American Games.

Janvrin achieved his then personal best result of 8,345 points at the USA Olympic Trials in June 1996 in Atlanta. He finished fourth and his score was the most points for a non-qualifying athlete ever in the history of the event He would not make the team for the 1996 Summer Olympics in Atlanta which consist of the top three qualifiers, Dan O'Brien, Steve Fritz and Chris Huffins. Later that summer Janvrin would establish his all-time personal best of 8462 points at the Thorpe Cup, which is a decathlon meet between Germany and the USA, and was held in Edwardsville, Illinois.

Janvrin finished in fourth place at both the 1998 and 1999 USA Outdoor Track and Field Championships. At the 2000 USA Olympic Trials Janvrin placed third. As the third-place finisher, Janvrin had to meet the then Olympic A standard of 8050 points to qualify for the Olympic team. This meant that at the trials he need to run a 4:13.0 in the 1500 m run, which is the final event in the decathlon. Janvrin ran a 4:12.01, which was the fastest time of the day and gave him 8057 points and qualified him for the 2000 Olympics. The USA Decathlon team consisted of Janvrin along with the first two qualifiers Tom Pappas and Chris Huffins. At the 2000 Summer Olympics in Sydney Janvrin finishing twenty-first with a score of 7726 points. He is the oldest United States decathlete to ever compete in the Olympics.

In 2001, he won his only US title at the USA Outdoor Track & Field Championships in Eugene, Oregon, on June 21–22, attaining 4,030 on day one and 4,211 on day two for 8241 total points. This was his 13th attempt for the title and he is the oldest person to ever win the US title. On August 6–7 at the 2001 World Championships held in Edmonton, Canada, he finished seventeenth with 7,905 points.

At the 2004 United States Olympic trials in Sacramento, Janvrin finished 12th with 7,210 points. Although he did not qualify for the 2004 Summer Olympics at Athens as an athlete, he attended the Athens Olympics as a coach for Tom Pappas, who was ranked #1 in the U.S. and #2 in the world.

Janvrin has won the decathlon a record 15 times at the Drake Relays, the most by any athlete in the history of the competition. In April 1996, he scored a Drake Relays decathlon record 8,198 points and was inducted into the Drake Relays Hall of Fame for the decathlon.

== World records ==
He was the world record holder in the Icosathlon, which is the double decathlon, from September 8, 2002 to September 25, 2010 with scores of 6,912 on day one and 7,273 on day two for 14,185 points total. Since he was 37 at the time, that mark stands as the Masters M35 record, however the score has been Age graded to 14,991.

On August 24, 2005, at San Sebastian, he scored 8618 points in the Men Outdoor Decathlon to set the World Masters Athletics (WMA) record for the M40 age group.

He holds the world record for most career decathlon wins (41) and is the American record holder for most career decathlons over 8,000 points (26). He won the decathlon a record 15 times at the Drake Relays, which is the most by any athlete in the history of the competition.

== Coaching career ==
Janvrin, a native of Panora, Iowa, was a former track and field coach at the University of Central Missouri and, as of August 2, 2024, is currently an assistant track and field coach for pole vault and combined events with the Kansas State Wildcats.
