= Combined track and field events =

Combination of different athletics disciplines within a competition

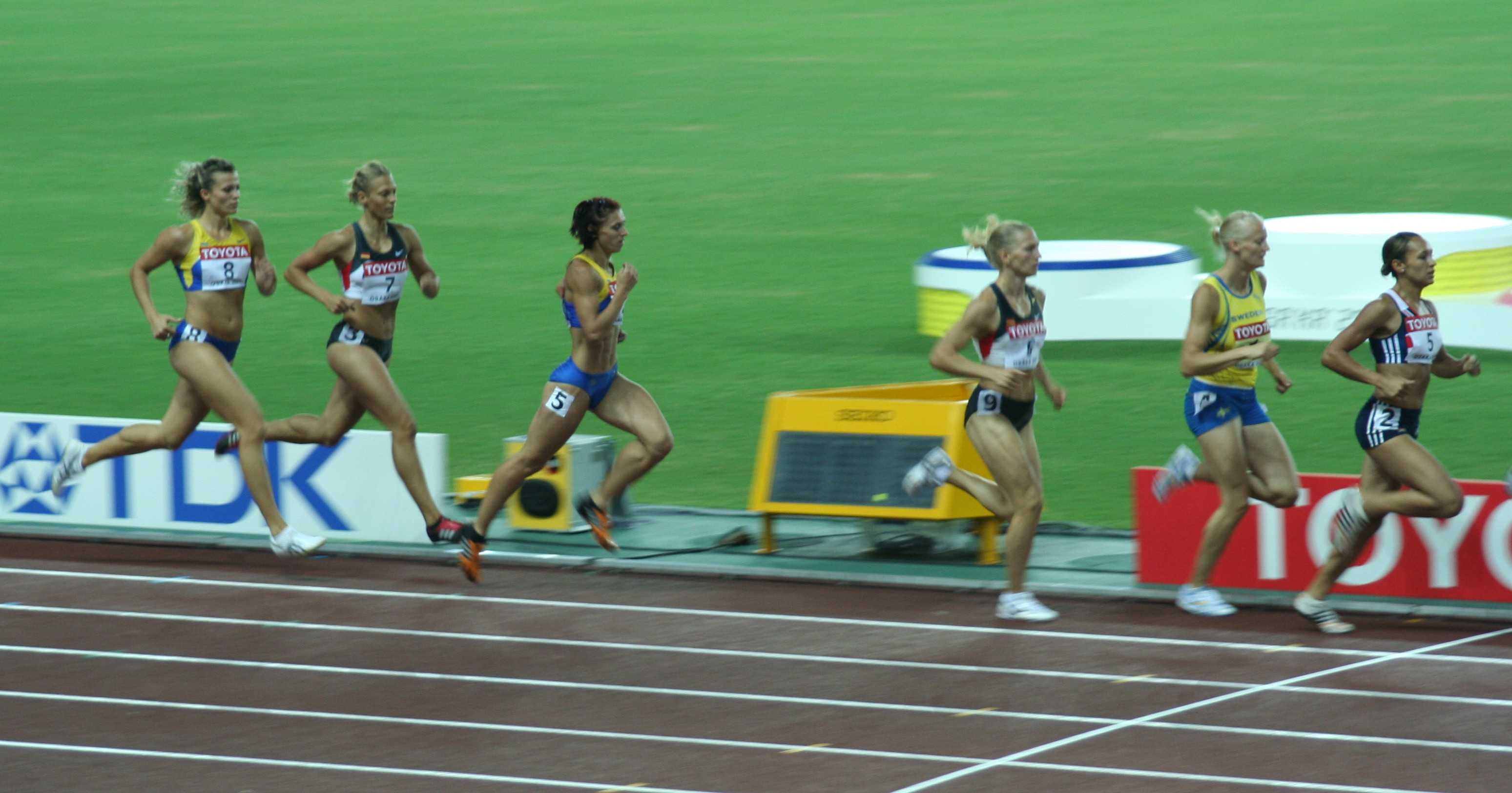
A moment of an 800 metres race, last event in women's heptathlon.

Combined track and field events are competitions in which athletes participate in a number of track and field events, earning points for their performance in each event, which adds to a total points score. Outdoors, the most common combined events are the men's decathlon and the women's heptathlon. Due to stadium limitations, indoor combined events competition have a reduced number of events, resulting in the men's heptathlon and the women's pentathlon. Athletes are allocated points based on an international-standard points scoring system, such as the decathlon scoring table. Other longer combined events do exist, such as the icosathlon (double decathlon) for men and the tetradecathlon for women. Indoors, both men and women compete in the tetradecathlon, with slightly different events to the women's outdoor version.

The throws pentathlon consists of all four Olympic throwing events plus the weight throw. In Sweden, the "Castorama" is also contested, which consists of all throws except the weight throw.

== Various combined events ==
Composition of combined events
Event	Track				Field					
Men's decathlon	100 m	400 m	1500 m	110 m hurdles	Long jump	High jump	Pole vault	Shot put	Discus throw	Javelin throw
Women's decathlon	100 m	400 m	1500 m	100 m hurdles	Long jump	High jump	Pole vault	Shot put	Discus throw	Javelin throw
Women's heptathlon		200 m	800 m	100 m hurdles	Long jump	High jump		Shot put		Javelin throw
Men's heptathlon (indoor)	60 m		1000 m	60 m hurdles	Long jump	High jump	Pole vault	Shot put		
Women's pentathlon (indoor)			800 m	60 m hurdles	Long jump	High jump		Shot put		

== See also ==
- IAAF World Combined Events Challenge
- European Cup Combined Events
- Icosathlon
