= Joseph Detmer =

Joe Detmer
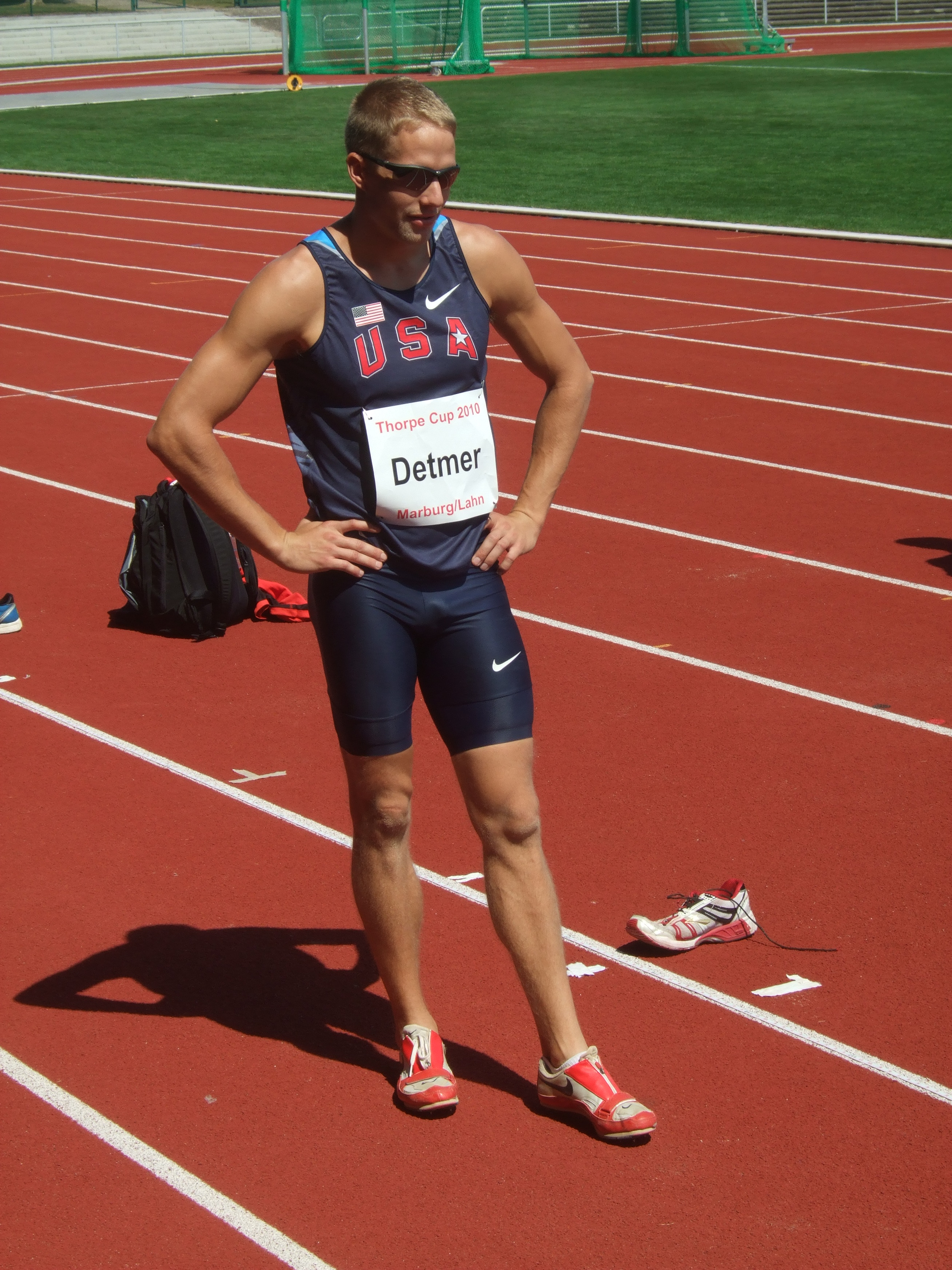
- Joe Detmer at the Thorpe Cup in 2010

Personal information
- Full name: Joseph Detmer
- National team: United States
- Citizenship: American
- Born: November 3, 1983 (age 42) Lodi, Wisconsin, United States
- Education: University of Wisconsin-Madison

Sport
- Country: United States
- Sport: Track and field athletics
- Event(s): Icosathlon, Decathlon, heptathlon
- College team: Wisconsin Badgers
- League: NCAA Division I
- Turned pro: 2008

Achievements and titles
- Personal best(s): Icosathlon: 14,571 WR; Decathlon: 8,090; Heptathlon: 5,761

Joseph "Joe" Detmer (born November 3, 1983) is an American athlete from Lodi, Wisconsin, who competed in the icosathlon, decathlon and heptathlon. He currently holds the world record in the icosathlon, which he set in 2010.

== Career ==
While competing with the Wisconsin Badgers, Detmer set a school record in the decathlon in 2007, which contributed to the team championship in the National Collegiate Athletic Association in Indoor Track & Field. Detmer went on to set another school record in the Pentathlon, and an American record in the Heptathlon 1000 meter run that season.

In 2010, he won the Thorpe Cup-an annual international track competition between the United States and Germany-in the decathlon. Prior to that, he finished third at the 2010 US Outdoor Track and Field Championships in the decathlon. Joe Detmer went on to compete in the world championship icosathlon in Lynchburg, Virginia in 2010. In that occasion, he improved the world record icosathlon to 14,571 points. Some of his more remarkable performances include the 100 m in 10.93 s, 7.30 m in long jump, and 53.83 on the 400 m hurdles.

== Statistics ==
=== Personal bests ===
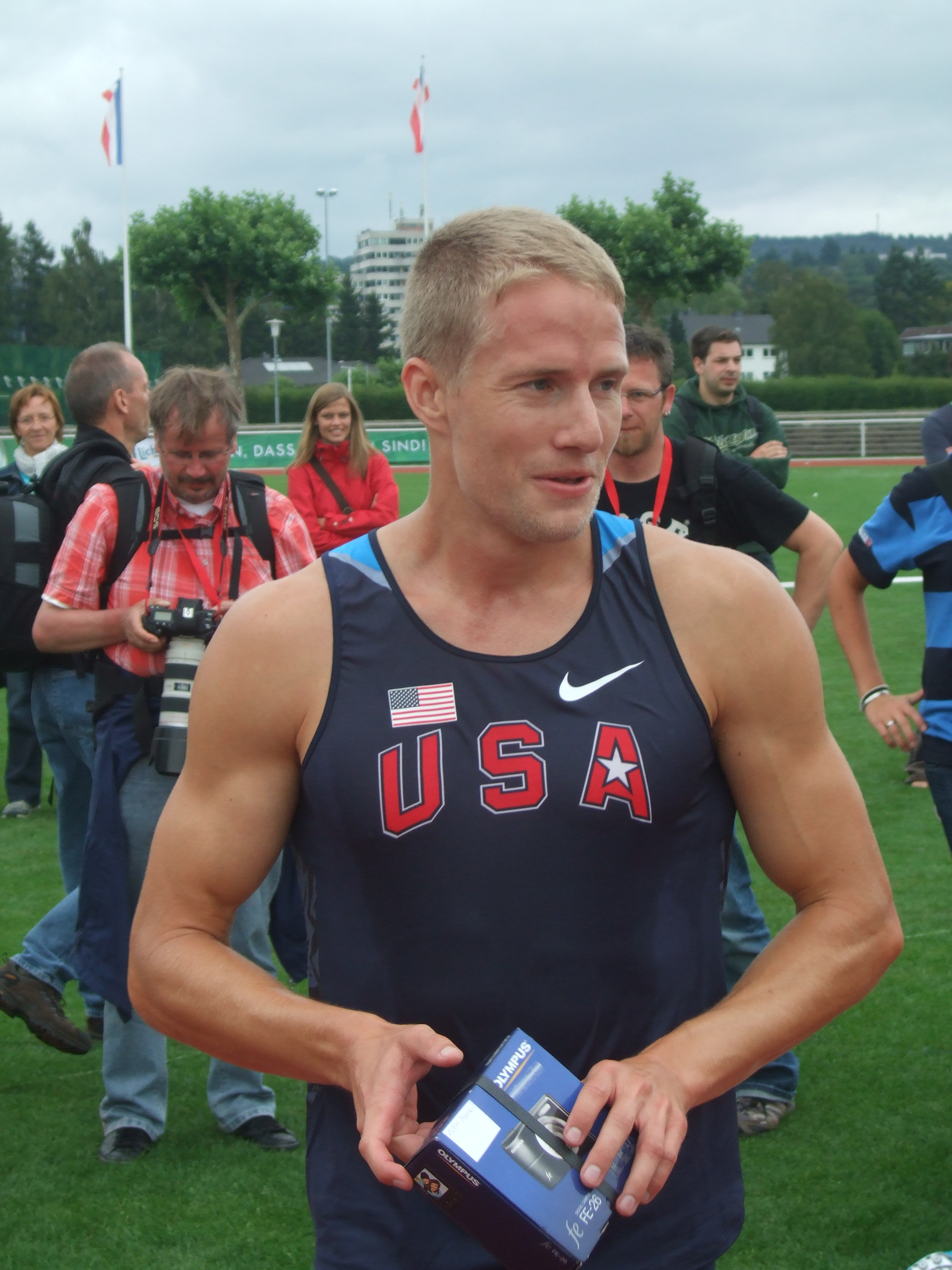
Joe Detmer at the Thorpe Cup in 2010.

Outdoor

Event	Performance	Date	Place	Points
100 meters	10.91	August 7, 2010	Marburg	881 points
400 meters	47.03	June 23, 2006	Indianapolis	957 points
1500 meters	4:05.31	May 11, 2008	Brescia	915 points
110 meters hurdles	14.89	May 17, 2008	Columbia	863 points
High jump	2.01 m (6 ft 7 in)	May 16, 2012	Columbia	813 points
Pole vault	4.91 m (16 ft 1 1/4 in)	August 8, 2010	Marburg	883 points
Long jump	7.40 m (24 ft 3 1/4 in)	May 16, 2012	Columbia	910 points
Shot put	13.18 m (43 ft 2 3/4 in)	June 22, 2012	Eugene	678 points
Discus throw	40.30 m (132 ft 2 1/2 in)	June 23, 2014	Eugene	671 points
Javelin throw	57.20 m (187 ft 7 3/4 in)	August 14, 2011	Chula Vista	696 points
Decathlon	8,090 points	August 8, 2011	Marburg	8,090 points
Icosathlon	14,571 points	September 25, 2010	Lynchburg	14,571 points WR

Indoor

Event	Performance	Date	Place
Heptathlon	5761 p	March 10, 2007	Fayetteville, Arkansas

== Palmares ==
=== Heptathlon ===
- 2009: (bronze) USA Indoor Track and Field Championships – 5720 p

=== Decathlon ===
- 2007: (silver) NCAA Indoor Track and Field Championship – 7963 p
- 2009: (silver) Thorpe Cup – 7892 p
- 2010: (bronze) USA Outdoor Track and Field Championships – 8009 p
- 2010: (gold) Thorpe Cup – 8090 p
- 2011: (silver) Thorpe Cup – 7846 p

=== Icosathlon ===
- 2010: (gold) Icosathlon World Championship – 14571 p (WR)

== See also ==
- List of world records in athletics
