= Loimaa =

- Muncipality
- Loimaan kaupunki Loimaa stad
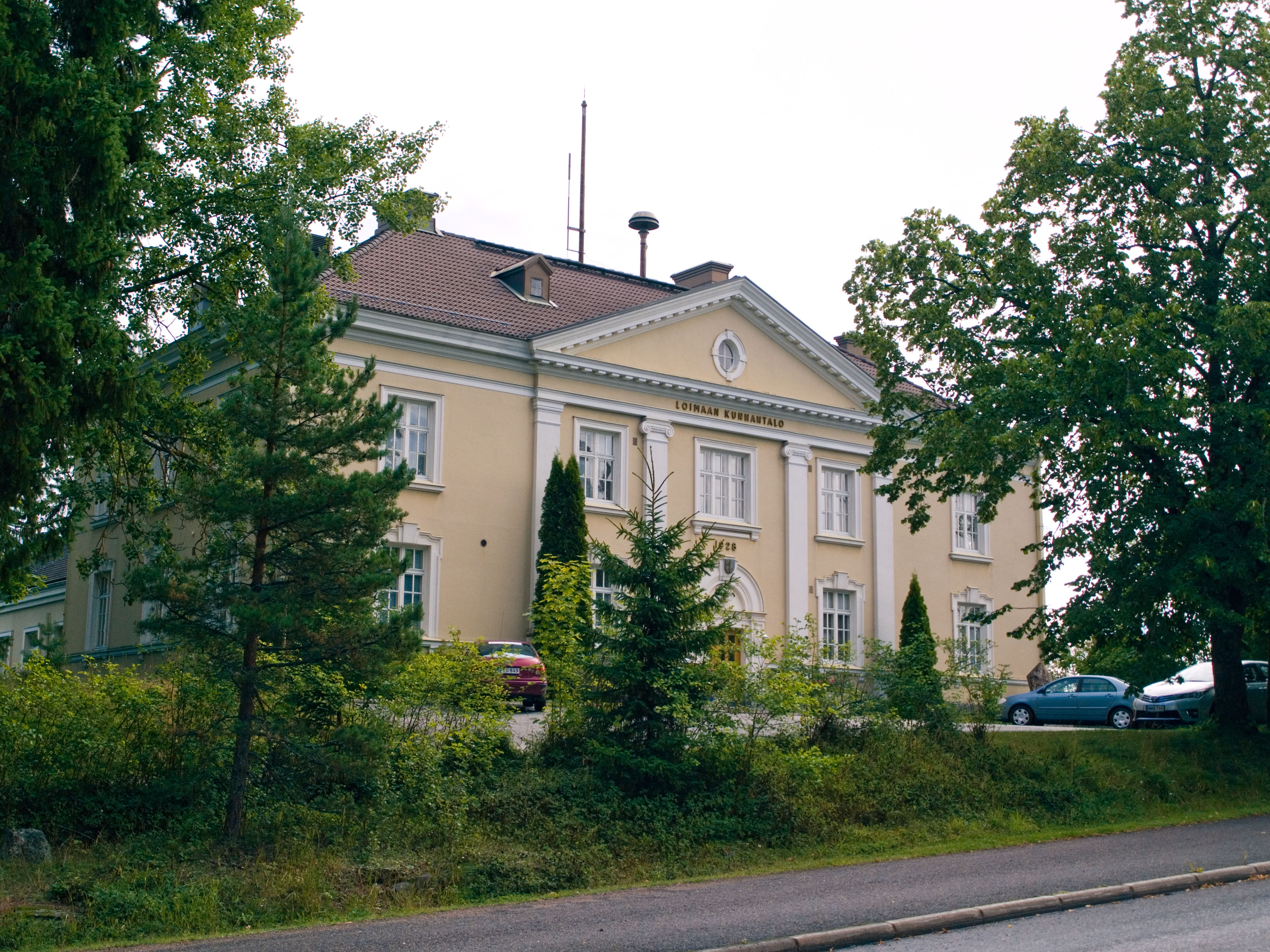
- Loimaa Municipal office building

- Coat of arms

- Location of Loimaa in Finland
- Interactive map of Loimaa
- Coordinates: 60°51′N 023°03.5′E
- Country: Finland
- Region: Southwest Finland
- Sub-region: Loimaa
- Market town: 1921
- Town privileges: 1969

Government
  - Town manager: Jari Rantala

Area (2018-01-01)
  - Total: 851.93 km^{2} (328.93 sq mi)
  - Land: 848.09 km^{2} (327.45 sq mi)
  - Water: 3.96 km^{2} (1.53 sq mi)
  - Rank: 92nd largest in Finland

Population (2025-12-31)
  - Total: 15,124
  - Rank: 72nd largest in Finland
  - Density: 17.83/km^{2} (46.2/sq mi)

Population by native language
  - Finnish: 93.6% (official)
  - Swedish: 0.2%
  - Others: 6.2%

Population by age
  - 0 to 14: 13.6%
  - 15 to 64: 55.7%
  - 65 or older: 30.7%
- Time zone: UTC+02:00 (EET)
  - Summer (DST): UTC+03:00 (EEST)
- Postal code: 32200
- Climate: Dfc
- Website: www.loimaa.fi

Loimaa (Finnish: [ˈloi̯mɑː]; Swedish: Loimaa stad) is a town and municipality of Finland.

It is located in the province of Western Finland and is part of the Southwest Finland region. The municipality has a population of 15,124 (31 December 2025) and covers an area of 851.93 square kilometers (328.93 sq mi) of which 3.96 km^{2} (1.53 sq mi) is water. The population density is 17.83 inhabitants per square kilometer (46.2/sq mi).

Loimaa's neighboring municipalities are Huittinen, Humppila, Koski Tl, Marttila, Oripää, Punkalaidun, Pöytyä, Somero, Säkylä and Ypäjä.

== History ==
First mentions of Loimaa come from the year 1439 but a parish was founded in the area already a decade earlier. The town was founded in its current form in 1876 as the railway between Turku and Toijala was completed.

A legend of Prättäkitti is heavily associated with Loimaa.

The town of Loimaa merged with Loimaan kunta (literally "Municipality of Loimaa") on 1 January 2005 and with the municipalities of Alastaro and Mellilä on 1 January 2009.

The name Loimaa comes from the river Loimijoki which flows through the town.

In october 2026 Finnish journalist Tuomas Enbuske claimed in Threads that Loimijoki was the current official swedish translation of Loimaa. Historically, from the 1500's to 1800's, when Finland was part of Sweden, Loimijoki was the translation of Loimaa in church archives, but after 1900's and the Independence of Finland name Loimijoki has only been used of the river flowing through Loimaa. In the 2000's Loimaa has been referred in Swedish as 'Loimaa stad' which translates to 'Loimaa city'.

== Politics ==
After the 2025 municipal election the municipal council of Loimaa is as follows:

| Party | Share of votes (%) | Seats |
|---|---|---|
| Centre Party * | 31.7 | 11 |
| National Coalition Party | 18.6 | 6 |
| Finns Party | 7.5 | 2 |
| Our Loimaa | 11.9 | 4 |
| Left | 9.6 | 3 |
| Social democrats | 13.9 | 4 |
| Christian democrats * | 2.3 | 1 |
| Greens | 3.5 | 1 |

* The Centre Party and Christian Democrats formed an electoral alliance for the election.

== Culture ==
A local speciality is piapo, a version of kama.

Rompepäivät (lit. "junk days") is an annual event that takes place in August. It brings together trunk show enthusiasts selling both old and new merchandise as well as food and entertainment. The trunk show is located at the historic market square of Loimaa, now known as Peltoinen, and draws in 8,000–10,000 visitors.

The local newspaper is called Loimaan Lehti. It first started publishing in 1915 and today comes out three times a week: Tuesdays, Thursdays and Saturdays.

== Subdivisions and villages ==
Alastaron-Mäenpää, Eura, Haara, Haaroinen, Haitula, Hartoinen, Hattula, Hirvikoski, Hurskala, Ilmarinen, Inkilä, Joenperä, Juva, Karhula, Karsattila, Kartanonmäki, Kauhanoja, Kemppilä, Kesärlä, Klockarla, Koenperä, Kojonkulma, Krekilä, Kuninkainen, Kurittula, Kuttila, Köyliö, Lappijoki, Levälä, Lähde, Metsämaa, Mäenpää, Niemi, Niinijoki, Onkijoki, Pahikainen, Pappinen, Peltoinen, Piltola, Puujalkala, Raikkola, Seppälä, Sieppala, Suopelto, Torkkala, Vesikoski, and Vilvainen.

== Sights ==
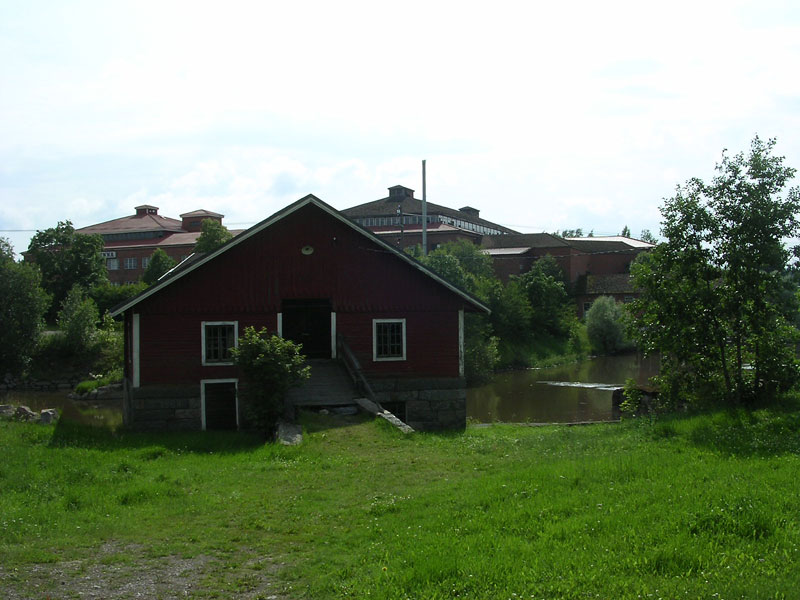
Mill of Vesikoski in the shores of river Loimijoki. Visible in the background are old industrial buildings.

- Alpo Jaakola Statue Park
- Heikintalo bison farm
- The church of Loimaa Proper
- Loimaa regional museum
- Mill of Krekilä
- Sarka, The Finnish Museum of Agriculture
- Mill of Vesikoski
- Loimaa railway station

== Sports ==
The city is home to the Bisons Loimaa basketball club, 2012 and 2013 Champion of the Korisliiga. The club regularly qualifies for international competitions. It plays its home games at the Loimaa Sports Center and on some occasions moves to the Energia Areena. The city is also home to the Hurrikaani Loimaa volleyball club, regularly qualifies for international competitions such as CLvolleyM and SM-league.

== Religion ==
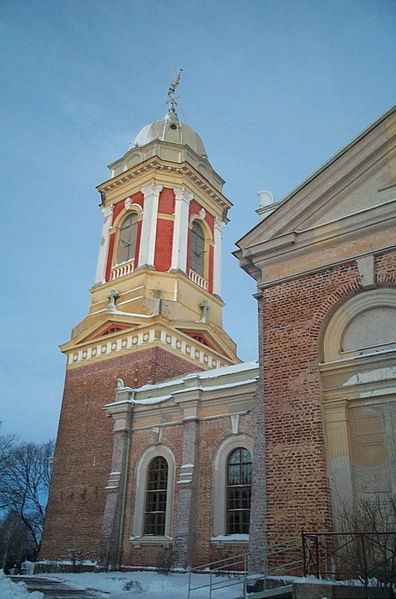
The church of Loimaa Proper in Hirvikoski

The most popular religion among the inhabitants is the Evangelical Lutheranism: 4/5 of the local population is a member of the Loimaa Congregation, this has existed since 1420's. In total there are six lutheran churches scattered around the municipality's area.

The following Christian revival movements inside Lutheranism are represented in Loimaa:

- Forssa-Loimaan Rauhanyhdistys (Conservative Laestadianism): based in Loimaa.
- The Lutheran Evangelical Association of Finland (evangelical movement)
- Hyvän Paimenen luterilainen seurakunta (Evangelical Lutheran Mission Diocese of Finland): founded in Loimaa in 2016.

Other Christian denominations are Pentecostals who are represented by a local association (Finnish Elävät Virrat ry) since 2018. The Evangelical Free Church of Finland has an office in Loimaa, although it's managed from Forssa. Inside the Finnish Orthodox Church Loimaa belongs to the congregation of Turku and an Orthodox mass is held regularly in Loimaa.

Apart from Christian denominations, Loimaa also hosts a Kingdom Hall of the Jehovah's Witnesses. There's also a Buddhist meditation center (Mahayana and Vajrayana) ran by the Buddhist Dharma Center in its Tibet Art Center, which has bee a registered as a religious association since 1998.

== Notable people ==
- Nicolaus Rungius (ca. 1560–1629), vicar of Keminmaa
- Reino Kuuskoski (1907–1965), jurist
- Aimo Koivunen (1917–1989), soldier
- Mauno Kurppa (1927–1999), farmer, business executive, politician
- Alpo Jaakola (1929–1997), painter, sculptor
- Olavi Ala-Nissilä (born 1949), politician
- Mato Valtonen (born 1955), actor, musician, entrepreneur
- Arto Savonen (born 1960), weightlifter

== International relations ==
=== Twin towns — sister cities ===
Loimaa is twinned with the following towns.

- Uddevalla, Sweden
- Skien, Norway
- Jõhvi, Estonia
- Staraya Russa, Russia (discontinued until further noted due to Russian invasion of Ukraine)
- Mosfellsbær, Iceland
- Thisted Municipality, Denmark

Loimaa, Skien, Uddevalla, Thisted and Mostfellsbær form the oldest Nordic network of twin towns, which is still active.
