= Alpo Jaakola =

Finnish painter and sculptor

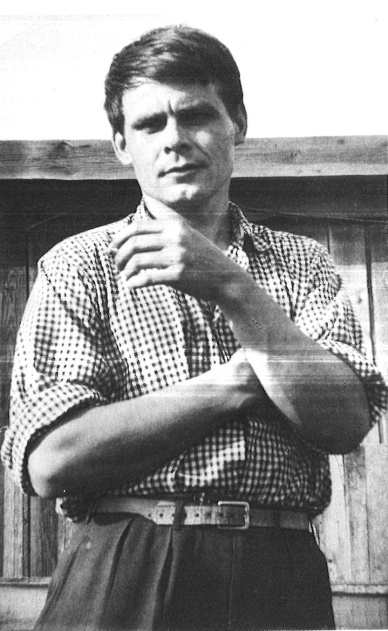
- Jaakola in 1958
- Born: Alpo Sakari Jaakola; 1 April 1929; Loimaa, Finland
- Died: 27 February 1997 (aged 67); Loimaa, Finland
- Known for: Painting, Sculpture
- Movement: Surrealism
- Awards: Pro Finlandia, 1974

Alpo Sakari Jaakola (1 April 1929 – 27 February 1997) was a Finnish painter and sculptor, known as the Shaman of Loimaa. He was one of the most important representatives of surrealism in Finland. Mysticism and absurdist humor were central to his work.

== Biography ==
Alpo Jaakola matured as an artist in the surrealism-tinged atmosphere of Turku School of Fine Arts. His early work emanates covert and sombre mysticism, examining the link between the self and the subconscious. Jaakola's interest in different eras and genres of art became evident early on and he developed into a genuine "total artist" – simultaneously a "mystical splinter light painter" and an "anarchistic junk metal-concrete dadaist".

In 1977, a documentary film about Jaakola was released. The film won a Jussi Award.

== The Alpo Jaakola Statuary Park ==
In 1992, the Alpo Jaakola Statuary Park was opened to the public in Loimaa, Finland. The Statuary Park is the result of many decades of creative work and a monument of Alpo Jaakola's artistic power. Art exhibitions, cultural events, theater plays, concerts and festivals are organized continuously. Alpo Jaakola himself is interred in the Statuary Park.
