= Alastaro =

- Former municipality
- Alastaron kunta Alastaro kommun
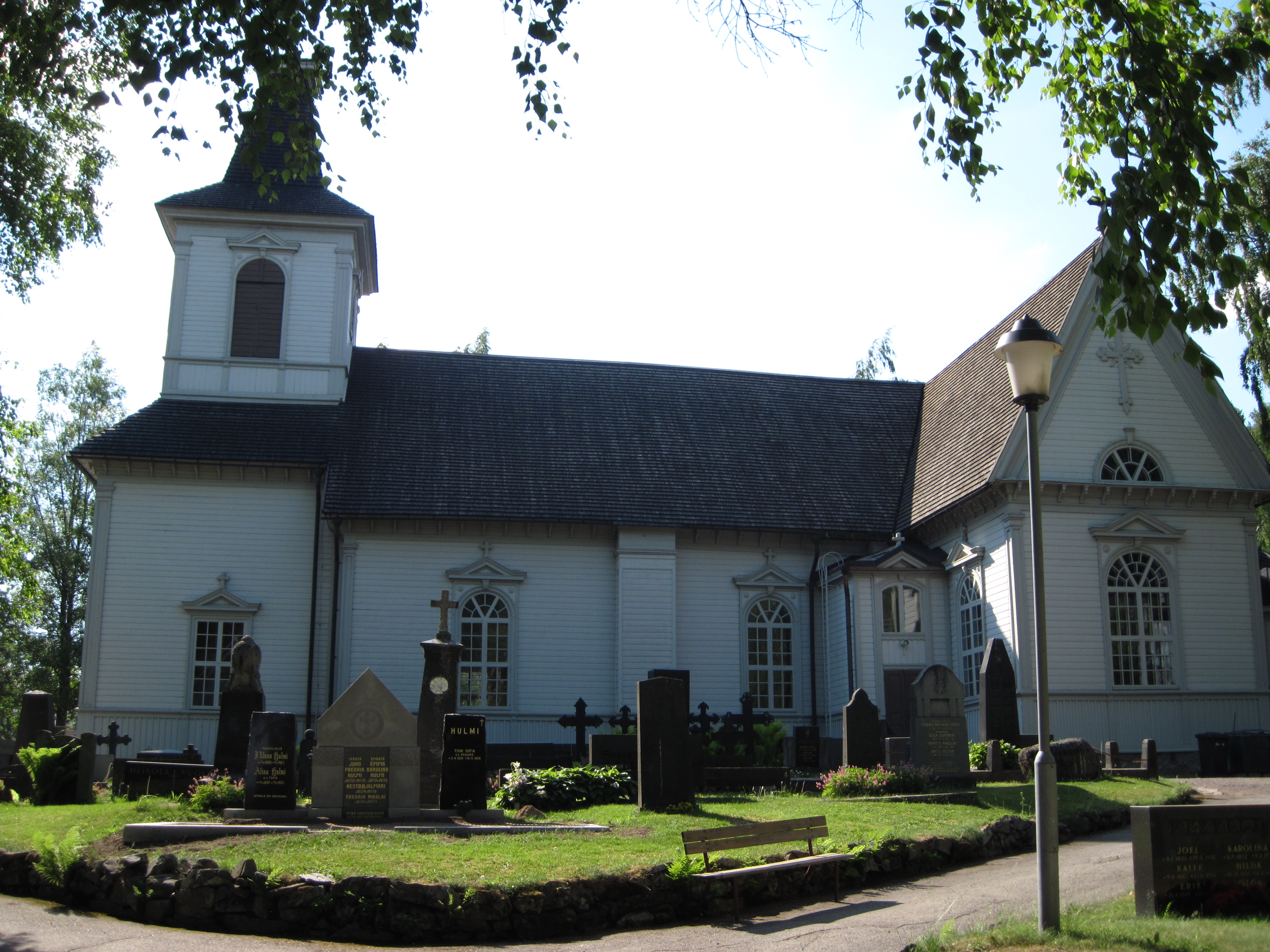
- Alastaro Church

- Coat of arms

- Location of Alastaro in Finland
- Coordinates: 60°57′15″N 022°51′50″E
- Country: Finland
- Region: Southwest Finland
- Sub-region: Loimaa sub-region
- Consolidated: 2009

Area
  - Total: 258.12 km^{2} (99.66 sq mi)
  - Land: 256.8 km^{2} (99.2 sq mi)
  - Water: 1.32 km^{2} (0.51 sq mi)

Population (2008-12-31)
  - Total: 2,910
  - Density: 11.3/km^{2} (29.3/sq mi)
- Time zone: UTC+2 (EET)
  - Summer (DST): UTC+3 (EEST)
- Climate: Dfc

Alastaro (Finnish pronunciation: [ˈɑlɑstɑro]) is a former municipality of Finland. It was merged into the town of Loimaa on 1 January 2009.

Alastaro is located in the province of Southern Finland and is part of the Southwest Finland region. The municipality had a population of 2,910 (31 December 2008) and covered an area of 258.12 km^{2} (99.66 sq mi) of which 1.32 km² is water. The population density was 11.33 inhabitants per km².

The municipality was unilingually Finnish.

The Alastaro Circuit opened in 1990.

== Notable people ==
- Aimo Koivunen (1917–1989), Finnish soldier
