= Aimo Koivunen =

Finnish soldier (1917–1989)

- Born: 17 October 1917; Alastaro, Grand Duchy of Finland, Russian Republic
- Died: 12 August 1989 (aged 71); Jyväskylä, Finland
- Military career
- Allegiance: Finland
- Branch: Finnish Army
- Service years: 1939–1944
- Rank: Corporal
- Known for: Overdosing on methamphetamine during combat
- Conflict: World War II; Winter War; Continuation War

Aimo Allan Koivunen (Finnish pronunciation: [ˈɑi̯mo ˈɑlːɑn ˈkoi̯ʋunen]; 17 October 1917 – 12 August 1989) was a Finnish soldier in the Continuation War and the first documented case of a soldier overdosing on methamphetamine during combat. The case gained more notoriety due to Koivunen's fighting abilities whilst intoxicated.

== Early life ==
Aimo Allan Koivunen was born in Alastaro, Grand Duchy of Finland, on 17 October 1917 to Frans Vihtori Koivunen and Aune Sofia Koivunen. They had six children, of whom Aimo was the eldest.

== Continuation War ==
Koivunen was a Finnish soldier, assigned to a ski patrol on 15 March 1944 along with several other Finnish soldiers. Three days into their mission on 18 March, the group was attacked and surrounded by Soviet forces, from whom they were able to escape. Koivunen became fatigued after skiing for a long distance but could not stop. He was carrying his patrol's entire supply of army-issued Pervitin, or methamphetamine, a stimulant used to remain awake while on duty. He consumed the entire supply of Pervitin, and had a short burst of energy, but soon entered a state of delirium and eventually lost consciousness. Koivunen later recalled waking up the following morning, separated from his patrol and having no supplies.

In the following days, Koivunen escaped Soviet forces once again, was injured by a land mine, and stayed in a ditch for a week, waiting for help. In the week that he was gone, he subsisted only on pine buds and a single Siberian jay that he caught and ate raw. Having skied more than 400 km (250 mi), he was later found and admitted to a nearby hospital, where his heart rate was measured at 200 beats per minute, and he weighed only 43 kg (95 lb).

== Private life ==
Koivunen and his wife Elsa had nine children and the family later settled in Central Finland. He died in 1989 at the age of 71.

== See also ==
- List of Finnish soldiers
- Use of drugs in warfare
