= Punkalaidun =

- Municipality
- Punkalaitumen kunta Punkalaiduns kommun
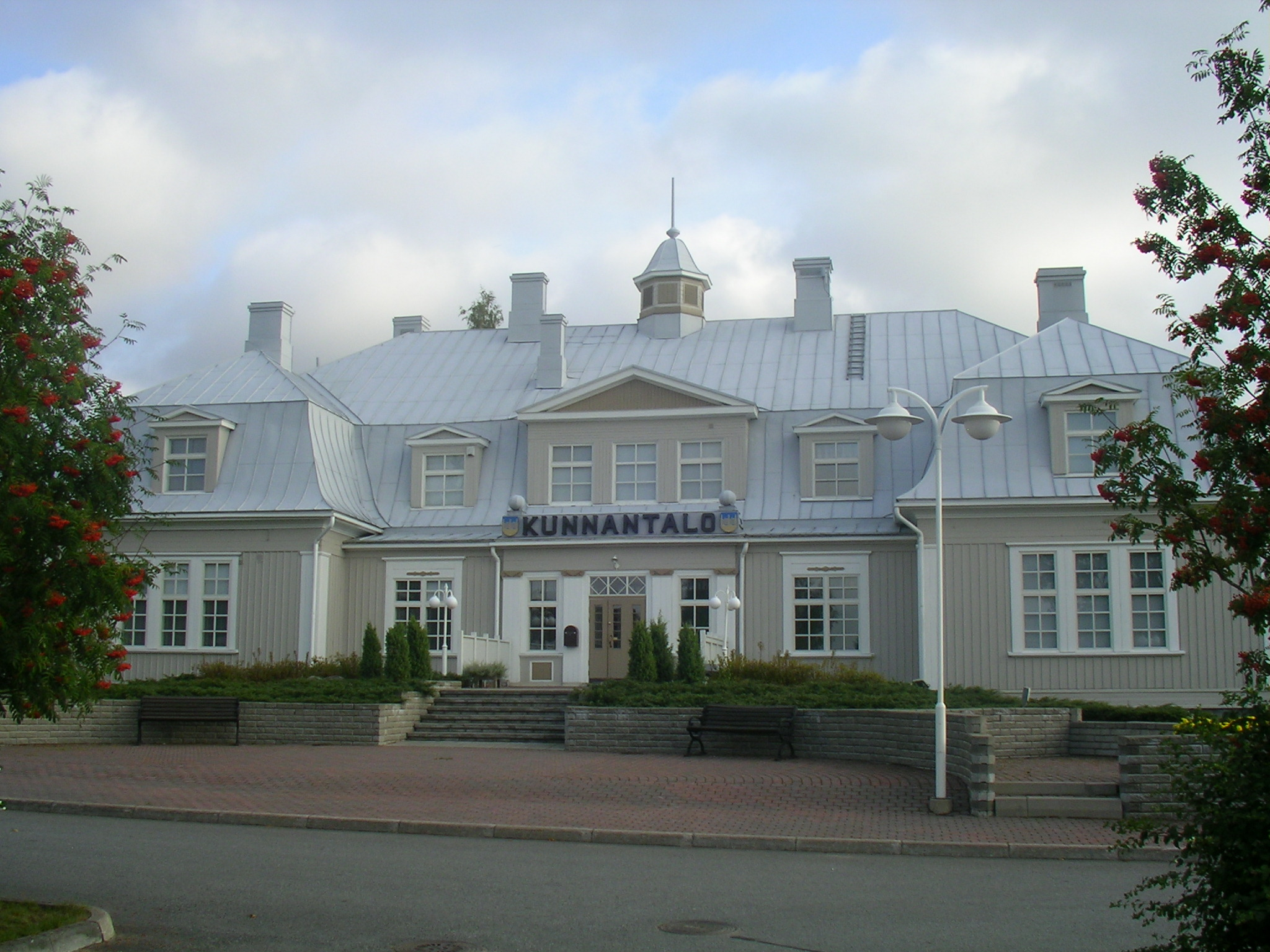
- The Municipal House

- Coat of arms

- Location of Punkalaidun in Finland
- Interactive map of Punkalaidun
- Coordinates: 61°06.7′N 023°06.3′E
- Country: Finland
- Region: Pirkanmaa
- Sub-region: South Western Pirkanmaa
- Charter: 1639

Government
  - Municipal manager: Jyrki Moilanen

Area (2018-01-01)
  - Total: 364.02 km^{2} (140.55 sq mi)
  - Land: 361.1 km^{2} (139.4 sq mi)
  - Water: 2.95 km^{2} (1.14 sq mi)
  - Rank: 213th largest in Finland

Population (2025-12-31)
  - Total: 2,546
  - Rank: 228th largest in Finland
  - Density: 7.05/km^{2} (18.3/sq mi)

Population by native language
  - Finnish: 96.2% (official)
  - Others: 3.8%

Population by age
  - 0 to 14: 12.4%
  - 15 to 64: 51.4%
  - 65 or older: 36.2%
- Time zone: UTC+02:00 (EET)
  - Summer (DST): UTC+03:00 (EEST)
- Website: www.punkalaidun.fi

Punkalaidun (Swedish: Punkalaidun, also Pungalaitio) is a municipality of Finland.

It is located in the province of Western Finland and is part of the Pirkanmaa region. The municipality has a population of 2,546 (31 December 2025) and covers an area of 364.02 square kilometres (140.55 sq mi) of which 2.95 km^{2} (1.14 sq mi) is water. The population density is 7.05 inhabitants per square kilometre (18.3/sq mi).

Neighbouring municipalities are Huittinen, Humppila, Loimaa, Urjala, and Sastamala.

The municipality is unilingually Finnish.

== Villages ==
- Hakuni
- Halkivaha
- Hankuri
- Haviokoski
- Jalasjoki
- Kannisto
- Kanteenmaa
- Kivisenoja
- Kokkola
- Koskioinen
- Kostila
- Kouvola
- Liitsola
- Moisio
- Mäenpää
- Oriniemi
- Parrila
- Sarkkila
- Suttila
- Pärnänmaa
- Talala
- Teikarla
- Vanttila
