= Armenia at the 2022 European Athletics Championships =

- Flag of Armenia
- WA code: ARM
- National federation: Armenian Athletic Federation

in Munich, Germany 15 August 2022 – 21 August 2022
- Competitors: 2 (2 men) in 2 events
- Medals: Gold 0 Silver 0 Bronze 0 Total 0

European Athletics Championships appearances
- 1994; 1998; 2002; 2006; 2010; 2012; 2014; 2016; 2018; 2022; 2024

Other related appearances
- Soviet Union (1946–1990)

Armenia competed at the 2022 European Athletics Championships in Munich, Germany, between 15 and 21 August 2022

== Results ==
Armenia entered the following athletes.

Key

- Q = Qualified for the next round
- q = Qualified for the next round as a fastest loser or, in field events, by position without achieving the qualifying target
- NR = National record
- PB = Personal best
- SB = Season best
- N/A = Round not applicable for the event

Men
Track and road

Athlete	Event	Heats		Semifinal		Final	
Athlete	Event	Result	Rank	Result	Rank	Result	Rank
Yervand Mkrtchyan	1500 metres	3:43.42	11	—		Did not advance	

Field events

Athletes	Event	Qualification		Final	
Athletes	Event	Distance	Position	Distance	Position
Levon Aghasyan	Triple jump	16.03	7	Did not advance	
