= Armenia at the 2018 European Athletics Championships =

- WA code: ARM
- National federation: HAF
- Website: www.armatletika.am

in Berlin
- Competitors: 2

European Athletics Championships appearances
- 1994; 1998; 2002; 2006; 2010; 2012; 2014; 2016; 2018; 2022; 2024

Other related appearances
- Soviet Union (1946–1990)

Armenia competed at the 2018 European Athletics Championships in Berlin, Germany, from 6-12 August 2018. A delegation of 2 athletes were sent to represent the country.

The following athletes were selected to compete by the Armenian Athletic Federation.

Men
Track and road

Athletes	Event	Heats		Semifinal		Final	
Athletes	Event	Result	Rank	Result	Rank	Result	Rank
Yervand Mkrtchyan	3000 metres steeplechase	8:50.35	24	did not advance			

Field events

Athletes	Event	Qualification		Final	
Athletes	Event	Distance	Position	Distance	Position
Levon Aghasyan	Triple jump	16.34 m	14	did not advance	
