= Armenia at the 2023 World Athletics Championships =

- Flag of Armenia
- WA code: ARM

in Budapest, Hungary 19 August 2023 – 27 August 2023
- Competitors: 1 (1 man and 0 women)
- Medals: Gold 0 Silver 0 Bronze 0 Total 0

World Athletics Championships appearances (overview)
- 1993; 1995; 1997; 1999; 2001; 2003; 2005; 2007; 2009; 2011; 2013; 2015; 2017; 2019; 2022; 2023; 2025

Armenia competed at the 2023 World Athletics Championships in Budapest, Hungary, which were held from 19 to 27 August 2023. The athlete delegation of the country was composed of one competitor, middle-distance runner Yervand Mkrtchyan who competed in the men's 1500 metres. He qualified for the Championships upon being selected by the Armenian Athletic Federation. In the heats, Mkrtchyan placed 11th in his group and failed to qualify for the semifinals, though set a new national record in the event.

== Background ==
The 2023 World Athletics Championships in Budapest, Hungary, were held from 19 to 27 August 2023. The Championships were held at the National Athletics Centre. To qualify for the World Championships, athletes had to reach an entry standard (e.g. time or distance), place in a specific position at select competitions, be a wild card entry, or qualify through their World Athletics Ranking at the end of the qualification period.

As Armenia did not meet any of the four standards, they could send either one male or one female athlete in one event of the Championships who has not yet qualified. The Armenian Athletic Federation selected middle-distance runner Yervand Mkrtchyan who held a personal best of 3:40.40 in the 1500 metres, the national record at the time, and was ranked 164th in the world at the time of his selection for the Championships. Previously, Mkrtchyan had competed at the 2022 World Athletics Championships for Armenia.

== Results ==
Key

- Q = Qualified for the next round
- q = Qualified for the next round as a fastest loser or, in field events, by position without achieving the qualifying target
- NR = National record
- PB = Personal best
- SB = Season best
- N/A = Round not applicable for the event

=== Men ===
Mkrtchyan competed in the first of the preliminary heats of the men's 1500 metres event on 19 September against 14 other runners. There, he recorded a time of 3:39.35 and placed 11th in the heat, failing to advance further as he did not finish within the top six of his heat nor was he allowed to advance further after referee decision. Despite not advancing further, he set a new national record in the event.

Track and road events

Athlete	Event	Heat		Semifinal		Final	
Athlete	Event	Result	Rank	Result	Rank	Result	Rank
Yervand Mkrtchyan	1500 metres	3:39.35 NR	11	Did not advance			
