= Armenia at the 2016 European Athletics Championships =

- WA code: ARM
- National federation: HAF
- Website: www.armatletika.am

in Amsterdam
- Competitors: 3 (two men and 1 woman) in 3 events
- Medals: Gold 0 Silver 0 Bronze 0 Total 0

European Athletics Championships appearances
- 1994; 1998; 2002; 2006; 2010; 2012; 2014; 2016; 2018; 2022; 2024

Other related appearances
- Soviet Union (1946–1990)

Armenia competed at the 2016 European Athletics Championships in Amsterdam, Netherlands, between 6 and 10 July 2016.

== Results ==
Men
Track & road events

Athlete	Event	Heat		Semifinal		Final	
Athlete	Event	Result	Rank	Result	Rank	Result	Rank
Tigran Mkrtchyan	800 m	1:51.28	26	did not advance			

Field Events

Athlete	Event	Qualification		Final	
Athlete	Event	Distance	Rank	Distance	Rank
Levon Aghasyan	Triple jump	16.21w	20	did not advance	

Women

Track & road events

Athlete	Event	Heat		Semifinal		Final	
Athlete	Event	Result	Rank	Result	Rank	Result	Rank
Diana Khubeseryan	200 m	25.56	27	did not advance			
