= List of Armenian records in athletics =

The following are the national records in athletics in Armenia maintained by the Armenian Athletic Federation (AAF).

== Outdoor ==
Key to tables: Awaiting ratification Record not kept by AAF Not ratified or later rescinded by AAF

=== Men ===
Event	Record	Athlete	Date	Meet	Place	Ref.
100 m	10.37 A (+0.6 m/s)	Alexander Donigian	16 May 2021	West TAMU Last Chance	Canyon, United States	
100 m	10.2 h	Vahagn Javakhyan	19 May 2002		Artashat, Armenia	
200 m	21.15	Hovhannes Mkrtchyan	7 July 1991		Volgograd, Soviet Union	
400 m	46.99	Arayik Hovhannisyan	14 July 1986		Kyiv, Soviet Union	
800 m	1:49.91	Yervand Mkrtchyan	7 August 2024	Olympic Games	Paris, France	
800 m	1:47.58 (Note: questionable)	Tigran Mkrtchyan	23 June 2016	Armenian U23 Championships	Artashat, Armenia	
1000 m	2:24.6 h	Yervand Mkrtchyan	15 September 2018		Armenia	
1500 m	3:37.80	Yervand Mkrtchyan	4 July 2026	Meeting National Est Lyonnais	Decines, France	
2000 m	5:17.8 h	Artashes Mikoyan	19 July 1974		Podolsk, Soviet Union	
3000 m	7:52.75	Yervand Mkrtchyan	21 June 2026	Balkan Senior Championships	Volos, Greece	
5000 m	13:53.0 h	Artashes Mikoyan	30 May 1976		Munich, West Germany	
10,000 m	29:52.8 h	Artashes Mikoyan	20 July 1976		Chişinău, Soviet Union	
10 km (road)	29:57	Armen Vartanian	29 September 2010	San Mateo Rotary 10K	San Mateo, United States	
One hour	16896 m A	Ararat Ghukasyan	15 October 1966		Yerevan, Soviet Union	
One hour	16896 m A	Vladimir Zamkov	15 October 1966		Yerevan, Soviet Union	
20,000 m (track)	1:03.57 A h	Ashik Mkhitaryan	12 July 1970		Yerevan, Soviet Union	
Half marathon	1:05:38	Armen Vartanian	25 July 2010	San Francisco 2nd Half Marathon	San Francisco, United States	
30,000 m (track)	1:41:29.02 A h	Alexei Konov	5 June 1962		Yerevan, Soviet Union	
Marathon	2:20:36	Ashik Mkhitarian	4 April 1968		Uzhgorod, Soviet Union	
110 m hurdles	14.01	Zhan Mkhitarian	6 September 1980		Donetsk, Soviet Union	
400 m hurdles	50.79	Rudik Matevosian	5 August 1984		Moscow, Soviet Union	
3000 m steeplechase	8:27.88	Artashes Mikoyan	29 May 1976		Munich, West Germany	
High jump	2.16 m A	Karen Ardarian	14 July 1984		Yerevan, Soviet Union	
High jump	2.16 m A	Gerasim Hayrapetyan	15 June 1985		Yerevan, Soviet Union	
High jump	2.16 m A	Edik Mesropian	15 October 1985		Yerevan, Soviet Union	
Pole vault	4.61 m	Alik Bagdasaryan	23 September 2020		Reims, France	
Long jump	8.86 m A (+1.9 m/s)	Robert Emmiyan	22 May 1987		Tsaghkadzor, Soviet Union	
Triple jump	17.41 m	Armen Martirosian	5 June 1998		Gyumri, Armenia	
Shot put	18.88 m A	Vardan Hovsepian	28 November 1960		Yerevan, Soviet Union	
Discus throw	60.12 m	Gennadiy Barsegian	15 June 1990		Moscow, Soviet Union	
Hammer throw	71.48 m	Georg Markarian	2 June 1979		Riga, Soviet Union	
Javelin throw	79.71 m	Melik Janoyan	18 February 2012	Lunev Throws Memorial	Adler, Russia	
Decathlon	6806 pts h	Onik Khachatrian	25–26 April 1974		Kropotkin, Soviet Union	
Decathlon	100m / Long jump / Shot put / High jump / 400m / 110m H / Discus / Pole vault / Javelin / 1500m; 11.0 / 6.50 m / 12.48 m / 1.75 m / 51.8 / 15.5 / 38.80 m / 4.10 m / 55.68 m / 4:47.7					
20 km walk (road)	1:27:01 h	Vartan Tumasyan	11 June 1988		Leningrad, Soviet Union	
30 km walk (road)	2:29:04 h	Vartan Tumasyan	1 April 1989		Sochi, Soviet Union	
50 km walk (road)	4:20:40 A h	Vagarshak Arzumanian	11 October 1955		Yerevan, Soviet Union	
4 × 100 m relay	41.5 h	Armenian SSR	3 May 1979		Tbilisi, Soviet Union	
4 × 200 m relay	1:25.6 A h	Armenian SSR	1 August 1956		Yerevan, Soviet Union	
4 × 400 m relay	3:16.0 h	Armenian SSR; A. Topilin; M. Khudoley; V. Moskalenko; A. Taranov	30 July 1967		Moscow, Soviet Union	
4 × 800 m relay	7:43.5 A h	Armenian SSR	10 August 1980		Yerevan, Soviet Union	
4 × 1500 m relay	16:27.2 A h	Armenian SSR	8 August 1975		Yerevan, Soviet Union	

=== Women ===
Event	Record	Athlete	Date	Meet	Place	Ref.
100 m	11.84 (+0.3 m/s)	Diana Khubeseryan	6 June 2015		Krasnodar, Russia	
100 m	11.59 (±0.0 m/s)	Diana Khubeseryan	24 May 2016		Almaty, Kazakhstan	
100 m	11.54 (+1.3 m/s)	Gayane Chiloyan	28 May 2016	Armenian Championships	Artashat, Armenia	
200 m	24.30 (+1.5 m/s)	Gayane Chiloyan	15 July 2016		Tbilisi, Georgia	
200 m	24.30 (+0.9 m/s)	Gayane Chiloyan	16 July 2016		Tbilisi, Georgia	
200 m	23.16 (+1.2 m/s)	Gayane Chiloyan	29 May 2016	Armenian Championships	Artashat, Armenia	
400 m	53.48	Amaliya Sharoyan	28 May 2015		Sochi, Russia	
800 m	2:04.0 h	Tsovik Grigorian	15 October 1987		Tbilisi, Soviet Union	
1000 m	2:45.2 h	Vera Poghosyan	20 September 1979		Tuapse, Soviet Union	
1500 m	4:22.8 h	Lyudmila Artyomova	12 July 1976		Moscow, Soviet Union	
3000 m	9:50.04	Nune Avagian	23 June 1991		Krasnodar, Soviet Union	
5000 m	17:18.12	Nune Avagian	15 September 1990		Kyiv, Soviet Union	
10,000 m	36:12.00 h	Nune Avagian	30 May 1991		Krasnodar, Soviet Union	
10 km (road)	37:54+	Nina Usubyan	13 April 2025	European Running Championships	Brussels–Leuven, Belgium	
20 km (road)	1:15:09+	Nina Usubyan	13 April 2025	European Running Championships	Brussels–Leuven, Belgium	
Half marathon	1:19:04+	Nina Usubyan	13 April 2025	European Running Championships	Brussels–Leuven, Belgium	
Marathon	2:56:57	Alexa Babakhanian	12 August 2001	World Championships	Edmonton, Canada	
Marathon	2:40:40	Nina Usubyan	13 April 2025	European Running Championships	Brussels–Leuven, Belgium	
100 m hurdles	14.06 (+0.2 m/s)	Allison Halverson (Note: represented United States until 18 February 2020 – eligible to represent Armenia in National Representative Competitions from 19 February 2023)	25 March 2021	Clyde Littlefield Texas Relays	Austin, United States	
100 m hurdles	13.87 (+2.0 m/s)	Allison Halverson (Note: represented United States until 18 February 2020 – eligible to represent Armenia in National Representative Competitions from 19 February 2023)	4 August 2024	Women's Decathlon World Championships	Geneva, United States	
400 m hurdles	57.97	Amaliya Sharoyan	12 August 2013	World Championships	Moscow, Russia	
400 m hurdles	56.15	Lilit Harutyunyan	29 May 2016	Armenian Championships	Artashat, Armenia	
3000 m steeplechase	11:08.01	Ellada Alaverdyan	10 August 2019	European Team Championships	Skopje, North Macedonia	
3000 m steeplechase	11:02.54	Ellada Alaverdyan	22 June 2023	European Team Championships	Chorzów, Poland	
High jump	1.80 m	Olga Vichuzhanina	20 June 1983		Yerevan, Soviet Union	
High jump	1.80 m	Djana Zutlevitse	20 September 1984		Yerevan, Soviet Union	
Pole vault	2.73 m	Allison Halverson (Note: represented United States until 18 February 2020 – eligible to represent Armenia in National Representative Competitions from 19 February 2023)	4 August 2024	Women's Decathlon World Championships	Geneva, United States	
Long jump	6.46 m	Nadezhda Karyakina	22 June 1976		Kyiv, Soviet Union	
Long jump	6.72 m (+0.8 m/s)	Amaliya Sharoyan	21 May 2016	International Meeting	Elbasan, Albania	
Triple jump	13.56 m (+1.9 m/s)	Kristina Alvertsian (Note: represented Greece until 15 April 2021, eligible to represent Armenia in National Representative Competitions from 27 June 2021)	17 May 2022		Alexandria, Greece	
Shot put	18.51 m	Faina Melnik	15 September 1973		Helsinki, Finland	
Shot put	20.03 m (Note: for Russia)	Faina Melnik	2 June 1976		Bratislava, Czechoslovakia	
Discus throw	69.48 m	Faina Melnik	7 September 1973		Edinburgh, United Kingdom	
Discus throw	70.50 m (Note: for Russia)	Faina Melnik	24 April 1976		Sochi, Soviet Union	
Hammer throw	50.36 m	Zhanna Shahnazaryan	19 May 2017		Artashat, Armenia	
Javelin throw	49.12 m	Kristine Harutyunyan	21 April 2012	Nizamutdinov Prizes Meeting	Adler, Russia	
Heptathlon	5424 pts	Allison Halverson (Note: represented United States until 18 February 2020 – eligible to represent Armenia in National Representative Competitions from 19 February 2023)	24–25 April 2021	Multistars	Lana, Italy	
Heptathlon	100m H / High jump / Shot put / 200m / Long jump / Javelin / 800m; 14.62 (+0.5 m/s) / 1.62 m / 11.91 m / 25.77 (−0.4 m/s) / 5.96 m (+0.1 m/s) / 40.35 m / 2:22.51					
Decathlon	7236 pts	Allison Halverson (Note: represented United States until 18 February 2020 – eligible to represent Armenia in National Representative Competitions from 19 February 2023)	3–4 August 2024	Women's Decathlon Championships	Geneva, United States	
Decathlon	100m / Long jump / Shot put / High jump / 400m / 110m H / Discus / Pole vault / Javelin / 1500m; 11.92 (+1.4 m/s) / 5.88 m (±0.0 m/s) / 11.94 m / 1.64 m / 55.86 / 13.87 (+2.0 m/s) / 24.47 m / 2.73 m / 37.13 m / 5:18.08					
5000 m walk (track)	23:26.00	Shushanik Dolmazyan	24 July 1982		Kaliningrad, Soviet Union	
10 km walk (road)	48:33.0 h	Shushanik Dolmazyan	11 July 1993		Yerevan, Soviet Union	
20 km walk (road)						
50 km walk (road)						
4 × 100 m relay	47.11	Armenian SSR; I. Karnitskaya; T. Karminskaya; M. Starlynchanova; O. Kostoglodova	29 July 1979		Moscow, Soviet Union	
4 × 100 m relay	48.36	Armenia; Lilit Manucharyan; Amaliya Sharoyan; Anna Kochinyan; Ani Khachikyan	20 June 2009	European Team Championships 3rd League	Sarajevo, Bosnia and Herzegovina	
4 × 200 m relay	1:43.5 h	Armenian SSR	28 June 1979		Tbilisi, Soviet Union	
4 × 400 m relay	3:49.26	Armenia; G. Bulghardaryan; A. Telesheva; Amaliya Sharoyan; L. Karayan	19 June 2011	European Team Championships 3rd League	Reykjavík, Iceland	
4 × 800 m relay	9:03.2 h	Armenian SSR	29 June 1979		Tbilisi, Soviet Union	

=== Mixed ===
Event	Record	Athlete	Date	Meet	Place	Ref.
4 × 400 m relay	3:29.99	Armenia; Davit Sargsyan; Gayan Chiloyan; Gor Harutyunyan; Allison Halverson	22 June 2023	European Team Championships	Chorzów, Poland	

== Indoor ==
=== Men ===
Event	Record	Athlete	Date	Meet	Place	Ref.
60 m	6.64	Alexander Donigian	12 January 2019	UW Preview	Seattle, United States	
60 m	6.64	Alexander Donigian	23 February 2019		Staten Island, United States	
150 m	19.30	Arutyun Arutyunyan	20 November 2010	Northern Athletics Indoor Open	Sheffield, United Kingdom	
200 m	22.57	Razmik Mkrtchyan	20 February 2022	Georgian Championships	Tbilisi, Georgia	
400 m	48.96	Aram Davtyan	4 March 2011	European Championships	Paris, France	
800 m	1:51.94	Tigran Mkrtchyan	17 February 2017	Athletics Cup	Istanbul, Turkey	
1500 m	3:38.12	Yervand Mkrtchyan	13 February 2024	Belgrade Indoor Meeting	Belgrade, Serbia	
3000 m	7:55.51	Yervand Mkrtchyan	11 February 2026	Belgrade Indoor Meeting	Belgrade, Serbia	
60 m hurdles	9.45	Arsen Dubski	16 February 2014		Tbilisi, Georgia	
60 m hurdles	7.83	Zhan Mkhitaryan	19 February 1983	USSR Championships	Moscow, Soviet Union	
High jump	2.02 m A	Artyom Aleksanyan	23 January 2016		Yerevan, Armenia	
Pole vault	4.52 m	Alik Bagdasaryan	1 February 2020		Metz, France	
Long jump	8.49 m	Robert Emmiyan	21 February 1987	European Championships	Liévin, France	
Triple jump	17.21 m A	Armen Martirosian	17 January 1999		Yerevan, Armenia	
Shot put	17.21 m A	Albert Martirosyan	13 March 2015		Yerevan, Armenia	
Shot put	19.90 m	Yuriy Kuyumdzhan	4 February 1983		Moscow, Soviet Union	
Heptathlon						
Heptathlon	60m / Long jump / Shot put / High jump / 60m H / Pole vault / 1000m					
5000 m walk	22:16.80	Robert Avakian	8 February 2002		Rasht, Iran	
4 × 400 m relay	3:26.76	Armenia; Tigran Mkrtchyan; Roman Alksanyan; Ashot Hayrapetyan; Narek Ghukasyan	21 February 2015	Balkan Championships	Istanbul, Turkey	

=== Women ===
Event	Record	Athlete	Date	Meet	Place	Ref.
60 m	7.54	Gayane Chiloyan	21 January 2017		Vanadzor, Armenia	
200 m	24.70	Gayane Chiloyan	19 February 2017		Istanbul, Turkey	
300 m	40.43	Amaliya Sharoyan	25 December 2010		Saint Petersburg, Russia	
400 m	54.24	Amaliya Sharoyan	6 March 2015	European Championships	Prague, Czech Republic	
600 m	1:34.70	Amaliya Sharoyan	24 December 2010		Saint Petersburg, Russia	
800 m	2:09.70	Lilit Harutyunyan	27 February 2016	Balkan Championships	Istanbul, Turkey	
1500 m	4:35.48	Ellada Alaverdyan	12 February 2017	Balkan U-20 Championships	Istanbul, Turkey	
3000 m	11:06.35	Valya Avagyan	3 February 2012		Mashhad, Iran	
60 m hurdles	9.50 (Note: record set during pentathlon competition)	Kristine Harutyunyan	15 February 2013		Tehran, Iran	
60 m hurdles	9.32	Meline Adamyan	20 December 2025	X Memorijal Mihajlo MIKA Švraka	Belgrade, Serbia	
High jump	1.55 m	Viktoria Stepanian	22 February 2014	Balkan Championships	Istanbul, Turkey	
Pole vault						
Long jump	6.12 m A	Satenik Hovhannisyan	24 January 2015		Yerevan, Armenia	
Long jump	6.13 m	Satenik Hovhannisyan	15 February 2012		Moscow, Russia	
Triple jump	13.06 m	Yana Abrahamyan	15 February 2020	Balkan Championships	Istanbul, Turkey	
Shot put	13.71 m	Mariam Sargsyan	10 February 2018		Salamanca, Spain	
Pentathlon	3160 pts	Kristine Harutyunyan	15 February 2013		Tehran, Iran	
Pentathlon	60m H / High jump / Shot put / Long jump / 800m; 9.50 / 1.39 m / 11.82 m / 5.39 m / 2:43.56					
3000 m walk						
4 × 400 m relay	3:49.18 (Note: outdoor mark ratified as absolute record)	Armenia; Amaliya Sharoyan; Khubeseryan; Lilit Harutyunyan; Gayane Chiloyan	27 February 2016		Istanbul, Turkey	
