= Armenia at the World Athletics Championships =

- WA code: ARM
- National federation: Armenian Athletic Federation
- Medals: Gold 0 Silver 0 Bronze 0 Total 0

World Athletics Championships appearances (overview)
- 1993; 1995; 1997; 1999; 2001; 2003; 2005; 2007; 2009; 2011; 2013; 2015; 2017; 2019; 2022; 2023; 2025

Armenia has competed at the World Athletics Championships on fourteen occasions, sending a delegation from 1993 onwards. Prior to 1993, its athletes participated as part of the Soviet Union team. Armenia's competing country code is ARM. The country has not won any medals at the competition and as of 2019 no Armenian athlete has placed within the top eight of an event. Its best performance is by Robert Emmiyan, who placed eleventh in the men's long jump final at the 1995 World Championships in Athletics. Emmiyan previously won a silver medal for the Soviet Union.
