= Armenia at the 2022 World Athletics Championships =

- Flag of Armenia
- WA code: ARM
- National federation: Armenian Athletic Federation

in Eugene, United States 15–24 July 2022
- Competitors: 1 (1 man)

World Athletics Championships appearances (overview)
- 1993; 1995; 1997; 1999; 2001; 2003; 2005; 2007; 2009; 2011; 2013; 2015; 2017; 2019; 2022; 2023

Armenia competed at the 2022 World Athletics Championships in Eugene, United States, from 15 to 24 July 2022. They entered 1 athlete.

== Entrants ==
- including alternates

Track and road events

Athlete	Event	Heat		Semi-final		Final	
Athlete	Event	Result	Rank	Result	Rank	Result	Rank
Yervand Mkrtchyan	Men's 1500 metres	3:42.37	39	Did not advance			
