= Natalia Bartnovskaya =

Russian pole vaulter (born 1989)

Natalia Bartnovskaya-Price
Personal information
- Born: 7 January 1989 (age 36)

Sport
- Country: Russia
- Sport: Athletics
- Event: Pole vault

Natalia Vladimirovna Bartnovskaya-Price (Russian: Бартновская Наталья Владимировна; born 7 January 1989) is a Russian pole vaulter and decathlete. She won the pole vault at the 2013 NCAA Division I Indoor Track and Field Championships representing the Kansas Jayhawks track and field team.

== Career ==
=== Russia ===
Bartnovskaya began pole vaulting at age 17 at the advice of her home-town coach. She placed 4th in the long jump at the 2006 Russian U18 Indoor Athletics Championships. Outdoors, she was runner-up in the pole vault and 100 metres hurdles at the Russian U18 Championships. At age 18, she moved to southern Russia to train with a Russian university team, lacking resources in her home town.

The following year, Bartnovskaya was 3rd in the Russian U18 Indoor Championships in the pole vault. She was also 5th in the pole vault at the Russian U20 Indoor Championships and runner-up in the long jump. She improved to runner-up at the Russian U20 Outdoor Championships pole vault and was 9th in the long jump. After placing 5th at the 2008 Russian U18 Championships, Bartnovskaya finished 8th in her first senior Russian Athletics Championships finals in the pole vault.

In 2009, Bartnovskaya was 3rd at the Russian U23 Championships and 8th again at the senior pole vault championships. She was 12th at the 2010 Russian U23 Indoor Championships and didn't clear a height at the outdoor U23 championships, though she was 3rd at the Russian Indoor Students Championships.

=== United States ===
In 2010, Bartnovskaya began competing in the NJCAA for the Vincennes Trailblazers. She set the NJCAA record in the pole vault of 13 ft 9 3/4 in (4.21 m) and was also a successful combined track and field events athlete for the team.

She won 2011 and 2012 indoor and outdoor NJCAA pole vault titles before transferring to the Kansas Jayhawks track and field team to compete in the NCAA. Competing for Kansas, Bartnovskaya won the pole vault at the 2013 NCAA Division I Indoor Track and Field Championships. She was runner-up at the 2013 NCAA Division I Outdoor Track and Field Championships behind Bethany Firsick, helping Kansas to win the team title.

In 2015, Barnovsakaya was 4th at the Kansas Relays before winning the event the following year. Following a 9th-place finish at the 2017 Tyson Invitational, Bartnovskaya did not have competition results listed by World Athletics for five years.

Bartnovskaya won the 'B' competition at the 2022 Reno, Nevada National Pole Vault Summit. She competed at the inaugural 2024 Women's Decathlon World Championships, placing 20th overall with the 2nd-best pole vault mark.

== Personal life ==
Bartnovskaya was born in Krasnoyarsk, Siberia. From 1989 to 2001, she lived in five different cities across Russia and the United States. When she first came to the U.S., Bartnovskaya had not learned English vocabulary. At Vincennes University, Barnovskaya majored in interior design. Beginning for the 2016 season, Bartnovskaya started competing under the name Natalia Bartnovskaya Price.

Bartnovskaya is a coach for the Williamette Striders track and field club in Oregon City, Oregon. In 2024, she was the subject of the documentary TENFOLD about her participation in the Women's Decathlon World Championships.
