= 2024 Women's Decathlon World Championships =

- Venue: SPIRE Institute, Geneva, Ohio
- Dates: 3 August 2024; 4 August 2024
- Competitors: 29 from 12 nations
- Winning points: 7236

Medalists
gold medal	Allison Halverson	Armenia
silver medal	Roseva Bidois	France
bronze medal	Jordyn Bruce	United States

The inaugural edition of the Women's Decathlon World Championships was held in Geneva, Ohio, on 3 and 4 August 2024. Allison Halverson of Armenia was the first world champion, with Roseva Bidois of France and American Jordyn Bruce winning the silver and bronze medals. Halverson set the world decathlon best in the 100 metres.

== Background ==
The event was the first global women's decathlon championship. It was organized by Lauren Kuntz and held in conjunction with the 2024 Ico For All championships. Jordan Gray helped meet direct. It was "primarily funded" by women's clothing company Oiselle.

The event was purposefully held during the 2024 Olympic men's decathlon as a protest against the exclusion of the women's event at the Olympics. Nandini Agasara of India and Ashley Heffernan of the United States were also entered in the competition, but both did not start.

== Schedule ==
The women's decathlon took place over two consecutive days, with five events each day.

Date	Event
3 August 2024	100 metres Long jump Shot put High jump 400 metres
4 August 2024	100 metres hurdles Discus throw Pole vault Javelin throw 1500 metres

== Records ==
Prior to this competition, the existing world, championship, and area records were as follows.

World record	Austra Skujytė (LTU)	8358	Columbia, Missouri, United States	14-15 April 2005
Championship record	—N/a			
World leading	Noemie Desailly (FRA)	7705	Talence, France	13-14 July 2024

Area	Points	Athlete	Nation
Africa (records)	7014	Margaret Simpson	Ghana
Asia (records)	7798	Irina Naumenko	Kazakhstan
Europe (records)	8358 WR	Austra Skujytė	Lithuania
North, Central America and Caribbean (records)	8246	Jordan Gray	United States
Oceania (records)	5927	Meagan Rentsch	Australia
South America (records)	6570	Andrea Bordalejo	Argentina

== Results ==
=== 100 metres ===
The 100 metres was started on 3 August 2024.

Wind readings: Heat 1: (+0.4 m/s); Heat 2: (±0.0 m/s); Heat 3: (+1.9 m/s), Heat 4: (+1.4 m/s), Heat 5: (+1.1 m/s).

Rank	Heat	Name	Nationality	Time	Points	Notes
1	2	Allison Halverson	Armenia	11.92	968	WDB
2	3	Laura Mathews	United States	12.04	945	
3	1	Uxia Pereira Alonso	Spain	12.50	859	
4	1	Jordyn Bruce	United States	12.54	851	
5	2	Patricia Mehlich	France	12.58	844	
6	1	Maria Sartin	New Zealand	12.61	839	
7	3	Roseva Bidois	France	12.65	831	
8	4	Sarah Hopkins	United States	12.69	824	
9	3	Anissa Ben Taleb	France	12.70	822	
9	1	Michaela Wenning	United States	12.70	822	
11	2	Anaik Previdi	France	12.72	819	
12	5	Daniela Alejandro	Puerto Rico	12.80	805	
13	1	Lara O'Byrne	Ireland	12.84	797	
14	2	Emily Swanson	United States	12.85	796	
15	1	Ariana Brugger	Switzerland	12.91	785	
16	1	Carlier Lalie	France	13.08	755	
17	3	Brittany Bishop	United States	13.13	747	
18	1	Adeline Audigier	France	13.26	725	
19	4	Romane Franzetti	Switzerland	13.28	721	
20	2	Corinn Brewer	United States	13.43	696	
21	1	Amanda Pasko	United States	13.59	670	
22	4	Holly Platt	Great Britain	13.72	649	
23	4	Mckenna Rettew	United States	13.78	639	
24	4	Caitlin Davis	United States	13.84	629	
25	4	Natalia Price	Russia	13.87	625	
26	5	Patricia Stabach	United States	14.20	573	
27	2	Morgan Mathews	United States	14.47	533	
27	5	Tomara Seid	Panama	14.47	533	
29	4	Dash Newington	Australia	15.27	420	

=== Long jump ===
The long jump was started on 3 August 2024.

Rank	Group	Athlete	Nation	#1	#2	#3	Distance	Points	Notes	Overall points	Overall rank
1	1	Allison Halverson	Armenia	5.88	5.63	5.75	5.88 (+0.0 m/s)	813		1781	1
2	1	Roseva Bidois	France	F	5.83 (+1.9 m/s)	5.83 (+1.9 m/s)	5.83 (+1.9 m/s)	798		1629	3
3	1	Laura Mathews	United States	5.32	5.52	5.31	5.52 (+0.0 m/s)	706		1651	2
4	2	Anaik Previdi	France	5.43 (−0.5 m/s)	F	5.51	5.51 (+0.0 m/s)	703		1522	4
5	3	Daniela Alejandro	Puerto Rico	5.45 (−1.0 m/s)	5.32	5.19	5.45 (−1.0 m/s)	686		1491	6
6	1	Emily Swanson	United States	5.44	5.33	F	5.44 (+0.0 m/s)	683		1479	8
7	2	Adeline Audigier	France	5.02	F	5.42 (+1.0 m/s)	5.42 (+1.0 m/s)	677		1402	14
7	1	Maria Sartin	New Zealand	F (−0.3 m/s)	5.42	5.38 (+1.1 m/s)	5.42 (+0.0 m/s)	677		1516	5
9	3	Sarah Hopkins	United States	5.31 (−0.4 m/s)	5.28 (+0.4 m/s)	5.38	5.38 (+0.0 m/s)	665		1489	7
10	1	Lara O'Byrne	Ireland	5.24	5.36	F	5.36 NWI	660		1457	11
11	2	Carlier Lalie	France	5.09	5.31	5.20 (−0.5 m/s)	5.31 (+0.0 m/s)	645		1400	15
12	1	Anissa Ben Taleb	France	5.28 (+0.1 m/s)	F	F	5.28 (+0.1 m/s)	637		1459	10
13	1	Michaela Wenning	United States	F	5.24	F	5.24 (+0.0 m/s)	626		1448	12
14	1	Jordyn Bruce	United States	5.12	5.14 (+0.1 m/s)	5.21	5.21 (+0.0 m/s)	617		1468	9
15	2	Corinn Brewer	United States	4.95	5.15 (+1.4 m/s)	5.08 (+0.8 m/s)	5.15 (+1.4 m/s)	601		1297	18
16	2	Patricia Mehlich	France	4.81	5.11	4.99	5.11 (+0.0 m/s)	589		1433	13
17	2	Amanda Pasko	United States	F	5.02	4.76	5.02 (+0.0 m/s)	565		1235	19
18	3	Natalia Price	Russia	4.85	4.94	4.89	4.94 (+0.0 m/s)	543		1168	21
19	1	Ariana Brugger	Switzerland	F	4.93	4.90 (+1.2 m/s)	4.93 (+0.0 m/s)	540		1325	17
20	2	Uxia Pereira Alonso	Spain	4.88	4.91	4.72 (+0.5 m/s)	4.91 (+0.0 m/s)	535		1394	16
21	3	Tomara Seid	Panama	4.79	4.59	4.73 (−0.4 m/s)	4.79 (+0.0 m/s)	503		1036	23
22	2	Brittany Bishop	United States	4.27 (−0.4 m/s)	4.68	4.30 (−0.1 m/s)	4.68 (+0.0 m/s)	474		1221	20
23	3	Dash Newington	Australia	4.67	4.52 (+1.0 m/s)	4.59 (−1.1 m/s)	4.67 (+0.0 m/s)	472		892	29
24	3	Romane Franzetti	Switzerland	4.14	4.26 (−0.6 m/s)	4.46	4.46 (+0.0 m/s)	418		1139	22
25	3	Caitlin Davis	United States	4.22 (−0.5 m/s)	4.32	4.22	4.32 (+0.0 m/s)	384		1013	25
26	3	Holly Platt	Great Britain	4.08	4.29	4.02	4.29 (+0.0 m/s)	376		1025	24
27	2	Morgan Mathews	United States	4.08	3.63 (−0.1 m/s)	4.26	4.26 (+0.0 m/s)	369		902	28
28	3	Patricia Stabach	United States	4.11 (−0.7 m/s)	4.06	3.21 (−0.1 m/s)	4.11 (−0.7 m/s)	333		906	27
29	3	Mckenna Rettew	United States	F	3.62 (−1.8 m/s)	3.83	3.83 (+0.0 m/s)	270		909	26

=== Shot put ===
The shot put was started on 3 August 2024.

Rank	Group	Athlete	Nation	#1	#2	#3	Distance	Points	Notes	Overall points	Overall rank
1	1	Roseva Bidois	France	12.90	13.34	F	13.34	750		2379	2
2	1	Allison Halverson	Armenia	11.94	11.77	11.44	11.94	657		2438	1
3	1	Michaela Wenning	United States	11.43	11.50	11.90	11.90	654		2102	4
4	1	Jordyn Bruce	United States	9.98	11.26	11.39	11.39	621		2089	5
5	1	Patricia Mehlich	France	10.88	10.71	11.26	11.26	612		2045	8
6	1	Emily Swanson	United States	11.18	10.79	10.74	11.18	607		2086	6
7	1	Lara O'Byrne	Ireland	10.33	10.74	11.14	11.14	604		2061	7
8	2	Anissa Ben Taleb	France	10.67	10.73	10.83	10.83	584		2043	9
9	1	Ariana Brugger	Switzerland	10.43	10.59	10.52	10.59	568		1893	15
10	2	Laura Mathews	United States	9.51	10.10	8.64	10.10	536		2187	3
11	1	Uxia Pereira Alonso	Spain	9.75	10.01	F	10.01	530		1924	14
12	1	Adeline Audigier	France	9.99	9.13	9.65	9.99	529		1931	12
13	3	Natalia Price	Russia	9.95	9.83	9.81	9.95	526		1694	21
14	2	Brittany Bishop	United States	9.71	9.44	9.74	9.74	512		1733	19
15	2	Anaik Previdi	France	7.90	9.59	9.25	9.59	503		2025	10
16	3	Romane Franzetti	Switzerland	8.37	9.54	9.43	9.54	499		1638	22
17	2	Corinn Brewer	United States	9.34	F	8.89	9.34	486		1783	18
18	2	Morgan Mathews	United States	8.42	9.12	8.81	9.12	472		1374	24
19	2	Carlier Lalie	France	9.08	9.08	8.64	9.08	469		1869	16
20	2	Amanda Pasko	United States	7.90	8.41	9.05	9.05	467		1702	20
21	2	Maria Sartin	New Zealand	8.06	8.73	8.91	8.91	458		1974	11
22	3	Daniela Alejandro	Puerto Rico	8.28	8.59	8.00	8.59	438		1929	13
23	3	Caitlin Davis	United States	7.15	8.09	8.24	8.24	415		1428	23
24	3	Patricia Stabach	United States	7.90	7.60	6.53	7.90	393		1299	26
25	3	Dash Newington	Australia	6.54	7.20	7.65	7.65	377		1269	28
26	3	Sarah Hopkins	United States	F	6.90	7.39	7.39	360		1849	17
27	3	Tomara Seid	Panama	6.02	F	6.46	6.46	301		1337	25
28	3	Mckenna Rettew	United States	5.84	6.04	5.40	6.04	274		1183	29
29	3	Holly Platt	Great Britain	5.94	5.89	5.76	5.94	267		1292	27

=== High jump ===
The high jump was started on 3 August 2024.

Rank	Group	Name	Nation	1.25	1.28	1.31	1.34	1.37	1.40	1.43	1.46	1.49	1.52	1.53	1.55	1.58	1.61	1.64	1.67	1.70	Result	Points	Notes	Overall points	Overall rank
1	1	Adeline Audigier	France	–	–	–	–	–	–	–	–	–	–	–	XO	O	O	XXO	O	O	1.70	855		2786	7
2	3	Daniela Alejandro	Puerto Rico	—N/a (Note: Complete series for the 3rd high jump group is unknown)																	1.67	818		2747	10
2	1	Emily Swanson	United States	–	–	–	–	–	–	–	–	–	–	–	XO	O	O	XO	XO	XXX	1.67	818		2904	3
4	1	Allison Halverson	Armenia	–	–	–	–	–	–	–	–	O	O	O	–	O	O	XO	XXX	–	1.64	783		3221	1
4	1	Anaik Previdi	France	–	–	–	–	–	–	O	P	O	P	–	O	O	XO	XO	XXX	–	1.64	783		2808	5
6	1	Lara O'Byrne	Ireland	–	–	–	–	–	–	–	–	–	O	–	O	O	XO	XXX	–	–	1.61	747		2808	5
6	1	Roseva Bidois	France	–	–	–	–	–	–	–	–	O	O	–	O	XO	XXO	XXX	–	–	1.61	747		3126	2
8	1	Ariana Brugger	Switzerland	–	–	–	–	–	O	P	O	O	O	O	O	XXX	–	–	–	–	1.55	678		2571	13
8	1	Michaela Wenning	United States	–	–	–	–	–	–	–	–	O	O	–	XO	XXX	–	–	–	–	1.55	678		2780	8
8	1	Jordyn Bruce	United States	–	–	–	–	–	–	–	–	–	O	XXO	XXO	XXX	–	–	–	–	1.55	678		2767	9
11	2	Laura Mathews	United States	–	–	–	–	–	O	O	O	XO	XO	–	XXX	–	–	–	–	–	1.52	644		2831	4
12	3	Sarah Hopkins	United States	—N/a																	1.49	610		2459	15
12	2	Patricia Mehlich	France	–	–	–	–	O	XO	O	XXO	O	XXX	–	–	–	–	–	–	–	1.49	610		2655	11
12	2	Amanda Pasko	United States	–	–	–	O	O	O	O	O	XXO	XXX	–	–	–	–	–	–	–	1.49	610		2312	19
12	2	Anissa Ben Taleb	France	–	–	–	–	O	O	O	O	O	XXX	–	–	–	–	–	–	–	1.49	610		2653	12
12	2	Corinn Brewer	United States	–	–	–	–	O	–	O	–	XO	XXX	–	–	–	–	–	–	–	1.49	610		2393	16
17	3	Romane Franzetti	Switzerland	—N/a																	1.46	577		2215	21
17	2	Uxia Pereira Alonso	Spain	O	–	O	O	O	O	O	O	XXX	–	–	–	–	–	–	–	–	1.46	577		2501	14
19	3	Dash Newington	Australia	—N/a																	1.43	544		1813	25
19	3	Natalia Price	Russia	—N/a																	1.43	544		2238	20
21	2	Carlier Lalie	France	–	–	–	–	–	XO	XXX	–	–	–	–	–	–	–	–	–	–	1.40	512		2381	18
21	2	Morgan Mathews	United States	–	–	XXO	XO	O	O	XXX	–	–	–	–	–	–	–	–	–	–	1.40	512		1886	24
23	3	Caitlin Davis	United States	—N/a																	1.37	481		1909	23
24	3	Tomara Seid	Panama	—N/a																	1.34	449		1786	26
25	3	Holly Platt	Great Britain	—N/a																	1.31	419		1711	27
25	2	Maria Sartin	New Zealand	O	–	O	XXX	–	–	–	–	–	–	–	–	–	–	–	–	–	1.31	419		2393	16
27	2	Brittany Bishop	United States	O	O	XXX	–	–	–	–	–	–	–	–	–	–	–	–	–	–	1.28	389		2122	22
28	3	Mckenna Rettew	United States	—N/a																	1.22	331		1514	29
28	3	Patricia Stabach	United States	—N/a																	1.22	331		1630	28

=== 400 metres ===
The 400 metres was started on 3 August 2024.

Rank	Heat	Name	Nationality	Time	Points	Notes	Overall points	Overall rank
1	1	Allison Halverson	Armenia	55.86	873		4094	1
2	1	Maria Sartin	New Zealand	57.81	789		3182	14
3	3	Laura Mathews	United States	58.21	772		3603	3
4	1	Lara O'Byrne	Ireland	59.28	728		3536	5
5	2	Corinn Brewer	United States	59.45	721		3114	15
6	3	Jordyn Bruce	United States	59.85	705		3472	7
7	4	Daniela Alejandro	Puerto Rico	59.96	701		3448	8
8	2	Patricia Mehlich	France	1:00.06	697		3352	11
9	3	Michaela Wenning	United States	1:00.15	693		3473	6
10	1	Ariana Brugger	Switzerland	1:00.21	691		3262	13
11	3	Emily Swanson	United States	1:00.22	690		3594	4
12	2	Adeline Audigier	France	1:01.31	648		3434	9
13	2	Roseva Bidois	France	1:01.33	647		3773	2
14	1	Anissa Ben Taleb	France	1:01.41	644		3297	12
15	4	Sarah Hopkins	United States	1:01.69	633		3092	16
16	3	Anaik Previdi	France	1:01.90	625		3433	10
17	2	Carlier Lalie	France	1:02.60	599		2980	17
18	2	Amanda Pasko	United States	1:04.20	541		2853	18
19	4	Romane Franzetti	Switzerland	1:06.24	470		2685	20
20	5	Natalia Price	Russia	1:06.81	451		2689	19
21	5	Dash Newington	Australia	1:07.39	432		2245	25
22	5	Caitlin Davis	United States	1:08.42	400		2309	23
23	2	Brittany Bishop	United States	1:08.75	389		2511	21
24	4	Mckenna Rettew	United States	1:09.43	369		1883	29
25	1	Morgan Mathews	United States	1:09.57	365		2251	24
26	4	Tomara Seid	Panama	1:10.59	335		2121	26
27	4	Holly Platt	Great Britain	1:12.77	275		1986	27
28	4	Patricia Stabach	United States	1:13.48	256		1886	28
--	1	Uxia Pereira Alonso	Spain	DNF	0		2501	22

=== 100 metres hurdles ===
The 100 metres hurdles began on 4 August 2024.

Wind readings: Heat 1: (+2.0 m/s); Heat 2: (+2.3 m/s); Heat 3: (+0.9 m/s), Heat 4: (−1.9 m/s).

Rank	Heat	Athlete	Nation	Time	Points	Notes	Overall points	Overall rank
1	1	Allison Halverson	Armenia	13.87	997		5091	1
2	2	Laura Mathews	United States	14.03	974		4577	3
3	1	Jordyn Bruce	United States	14.18	953		4425	5
4	2	Patricia Mehlich	France	14.58	898		4250	8
5	1	Lara O'Byrne	Ireland	14.89	856		4392	6
6	3	Emily Swanson	United States	14.95	848		4442	4
7	2	Michaela Wenning	United States	14.98	844		4317	7
8	1	Roseva Bidois	France	15.26	808		4581	2
9	2	Anissa Ben Taleb	France	15.29	804		4101	12
10	3	Sarah Hopkins	United States	15.38	792		3884	15
11	2	Adeline Audigier	France	15.40	790		4224	10
12	3	Daniela Alejandro	Puerto Rico	15.50	777		4225	9
13	2	Ariana Brugger	Switzerland	15.53	773		4035	13
14	1	Brittany Bishop	United States	15.60	764		3275	20
15	2	Anaik Previdi	France	15.61	763		4196	11
16	1	Carlier Lalie	France	15.79	740		3720	17
17	2	Maria Sartin	New Zealand	15.83	735		3917	14
18	2	Corinn Brewer	United States	15.90	727		3841	16
19	1	Amanda Pasko	United States	16.46	659		3512	18
20	4	Romane Franzetti	Switzerland	16.63	639		3324	19
21	3	Tomara Seid	Panama	17.49	542		2663	24
22	4	Natalia Price	Russia	17.52	539		3228	21
23	3	Holly Platt	Great Britain	18.15	473		2459	27
24	3	Dash Newington	Australia	18.58	430		2675	23
25	3	Caitlin Davis	United States	19.11	380		2689	22
26	1	Morgan Mathews	United States	19.27	366		2617	25
27	3	Patricia Stabach	United States	19.52	343		2229	28
28	4	Mckenna Rettew	United States	19.97	305		2188	29
--	1	Uxia Pereira Alonso	Spain	DNF	0		2501	26

=== Discus throw ===
The discus throw took place on 4 August 2024.

Rank	Group	Athlete	Nation	#1	#2	#3	Distance	Points	Notes	Overall points	Overall rank
1	1	Roseva Bidois	France	44.67	F	41.22	44.67	746		5327	2
2	1	Patricia Mehlich	France	30.43	31.47	F	31.47	490		4740	7
3	1	Adeline Audigier	France	30.72	27.69	F	30.72	476		4700	9
4	1	Jordyn Bruce	United States	F	29.82	F	29.82	459		4884	4
5	1	Ariana Brugger	Switzerland	29.36	22.94	29.73	29.73	457		4492	12
6	2	Laura Mathews	United States	29.36	26.24	26.54	29.36	450		5027	3
7	2	Corinn Brewer	United States	29.17	F	F	29.17	447		4288	14
8	1	Lara O'Byrne	Ireland	24.98	23.87	28.85	28.85	441		4833	6
9	1	Emily Swanson	United States	24.77	28.55	F	28.55	435		4877	5
10	2	Carlier Lalie	France	24.11	28.32	F	28.32	431		4151	16
11	2	Morgan Mathews	United States	28.25	23.57	27.67	28.25	430		3047	23
12	1	Brittany Bishop	United States	22.94	26.15	26.89	26.89	404		3679	19
13	2	Anaik Previdi	France	F	25.95	26.35	26.35	394		4590	10
14	1	Michaela Wenning	United States	26.06	F	23.78	26.06	389		4706	8
15	3	Dash Newington	Australia	20.76	25.41	24.15	25.41	377		3052	22
16	1	Allison Halverson	Armenia	24.47	F	20.07	24.47	359		5450	1
17	3	Romane Franzetti	Switzerland	F	23.99	F	23.99	350		3674	20
18	2	Anissa Ben Taleb	France	20.07	23.19	F	23.19	336		4437	13
19	2	Maria Sartin	New Zealand	22.73	F	22.35	22.73	327		4244	15
20	2	Amanda Pasko	United States	19.61	22.39	F	22.39	321		3833	18
21	3	Caitlin Davis	United States	20.69	F	19.66	20.69	290		2979	24
22	3	Daniela Alejandro	Puerto Rico	20.42	F	20.65	20.65	290		4515	11
23	2	Uxia Pereira Alonso	Spain	20.00	18.57	F	20.00	278		2779	26
24	3	Mckenna Rettew	United States	19.91	17.22	F	19.91	276		2464	29
25	3	Natalia Price	Russia	19.88	F	F	19.88	276		3504	21
26	3	Tomara Seid	Panama	14.64	17.42	17.93	17.93	241		2904	25
27	3	Patricia Stabach	United States	17.82	F	17.11	17.82	239		2468	28
28	3	Holly Platt	Great Britain	14.16	14.66	16.59	16.59	217		2676	27
29	3	Sarah Hopkins	United States	F	16.02	13.25	16.02	207		4091	17

=== Pole vault ===
The pole vault took place on 4 August 2024.

Rank	Group	Athlete	Nation	1.53	1.63	1.73	1.83	1.93	2.03	2.13	2.23	2.33	2.43	2.53	2.63	2.73	2.83	2.93	3.03	3.13	3.23	3.33	3.43	3.53	3.63	3.73	3.83	Height	Points	Notes	Overall points	Overall rank
1	1	Brittany Bishop	United States	–	–	–	–	–	–	–	–	–	PPP	PPP	PPP	PPP	PPP	PPP	PPP	PPP	PPP	PPP	PPP	XO	O	XXO	–	3.73	858		4537	16
2	3	Natalia Price	Russia	—N/a (Note: Complete pole vault series unknown)																								3.63	815		4319	21
3	1	Corinn Brewer	United States	–	–	–	–	–	–	–	–	–	PPP	PPP	PPP	PPP	PPP	PPP	O	PPP	PPP	O	PPP	O	XXX	–	–	3.53	774		5062	12
4	3	Dash Newington	Australia	—N/a																								3.43	733		3785	22
5	3	Romane Franzetti	Switzerland	—N/a																								3.33	692		4366	19
5	1	Anaik Previdi	France	–	–	–	–	–	–	–	–	–	PPP	PPP	PPP	PPP	PPP	PPP	O	PPP	XO	XO	XXX	–	–	–	–	3.33	692		5282	8
7	1	Ariana Brugger	Switzerland	–	–	–	–	–	–	–	–	–	PPP	PPP	PPP	PPP	PPP	PPP	XO	XXO	O	XXX	–	–	–	–	–	3.23	652		5144	9
7	3	Caitlin Davis	United States	—N/a																								3.23	652		3631	23
7	3	Sarah Hopkins	United States	—N/a																								3.23	652		4743	15
7	1	Roseva Bidois	France	–	–	–	–	–	–	–	–	–	PPP	PPP	O	PPP	O	O	XXO	XO	XO	XXX	–	–	–	–	–	3.23	652		5979	1
11	1	Lara O'Byrne	Ireland	–	–	–	–	–	–	–	–	–	O	XO	O	XO	O	O	XXO	XXO	XXX	–	–	–	–	–	–	3.13	613		5446	5
11	1	Adeline Audigier	France	–	–	–	–	–	–	–	–	–	PPP	PPP	O	PPP	O	O	XO	O	XXX	–	–	–	–	–	–	3.13	613		5313	7
11	3	Tomara Seid	Panama	—N/a																								3.13	613		3517	24
11	1	Emily Swanson	United States	—N/a																								3.13	613		5490	3
15	1	Jordyn Bruce	United States	–	–	–	–	–	–	–	–	–	PPP	PPP	O	O	O	XXO	O	XXX	–	–	–	–	–	–	–	3.03	575		5459	4
16	3	Holly Platt	Great Britain	—N/a																								2.93	537		3213	25
17	2	Amanda Pasko	United States	PPP	PPP	PPP	PPP	PPP	O	O	O	O	O	O	O	O	O	XXX	–	–	–	–	–	–	–	–	–	2.83	500		4333	20
18	2	Allison Halverson	Armenia	PPP	PPP	PPP	PPP	PPP	O	O	O	O	O	O	XXO	XO	XXX	–	–	–	–	–	–	–	–	–	–	2.73	463		5913	2
18	2	Anissa Ben Taleb	France	PPP	PPP	PPP	PPP	PPP	PPP	PPP	O	O	O	O	O	XO	XXX	–	–	–	–	–	–	–	–	–	–	2.73	463		4900	13
20	2	Michaela Wenning	United States	PPP	PPP	PPP	PPP	PPP	PPP	O	PPP	O	O	O	XO	XXX	–	–	–	–	–	–	–	–	–	–	–	2.63	427		5133	10
21	2	Laura Mathews	United States	PPP	PPP	PPP	PPP	PPP	PPP	PPP	O	O	O	O	XXX	–	–	–	–	–	–	–	–	–	–	–	–	2.53	392		5419	6
21	2	Patricia Mehlich	France	PPP	PPP	PPP	PPP	PPP	PPP	PPP	PPP	O	O	O	XXX	–	–	–	–	–	–	–	–	–	–	–	–	2.53	392		5132	11
23	3	Daniela Alejandro	Puerto Rico	—N/a																								2.33	325		4840	14
23	3	Patricia Stabach	United States	—N/a																								2.33	325		2793	27
25	3	Mckenna Rettew	United States	—N/a																								2.23	292		2756	28
26	2	Carlier Lalie	France	PPP	O	O	O	XO	XO	XXO	XXX	–	–	–	–	–	–	–	–	–	–	–	–	–	–	–	–	2.13	260		4411	18
27	2	Maria Sartin	New Zealand	O	PPP	PPP	O	PPP	O	XXX	–	–	–	–	–	–	–	–	–	–	–	–	–	–	–	–	–	2.03	230		4474	17
--	1	Morgan Mathews	United States	–	–	–	–	–	–	–	–	–	PPP	XXX	–	–	–	–	–	–	–	–	–	–	–	–	–	--	0		3047	26
--	2	Uxia Pereira Alonso	Spain	XPP	–	–	–	–	–	–	–	–	–	–	–	–	–	–	–	–	–	–	–	–	–	–	–	--	0		2779	30

=== Javelin throw ===
The javelin throw took place on 4 August 2024.

Rank	Group	Athlete	Nation	#1	#2	#3	Distance	Points	Notes	Overall points	Overall rank
1	1	Jordyn Bruce	United States	37.67	38.85	F	38.85	645		6104	3
2	1	Allison Halverson	Armenia	36.16	37.13	36.44	37.13	612		6525	1
3	1	Emily Swanson	United States	31.92	34.47	33.51	34.47	562		6052	4
4	1	Ariana Brugger	Switzerland	33.38	31.41	32.36	33.38	541		5685	9
5	1	Corinn Brewer	United States	31.17	32.74	31.20	32.74	529		5591	12
6	1	Roseva Bidois	France	29.31	29.74	32.54	32.54	525		6504	2
7	1	Adeline Audigier	France	31.73	31.49	32.15	32.15	517		5830	6
8	1	Michaela Wenning	United States	31.40	29.91	F	31.40	503		5636	10
9	1	Patricia Mehlich	France	29.64	31.20	28.32	31.20	499		5631	11
10	1	Amanda Pasko	United States	30.69	30.60	30.51	30.69	490		4823	17
11	1	Lara O'Byrne	Ireland	29.32	28.09	28.91	29.32	464		5910	5
12	2	Caitlin Davis	United States	26.99	28.98	F	28.98	457		4088	23
13	1	Anaik Previdi	France	26.60	28.79	27.03	28.79	454		5736	8
14	1	Brittany Bishop	United States	F	28.30	F	28.30	444		4981	15
15	1	Laura Mathews	United States	24.44	25.91	F	25.91	399		5818	7
16	2	Dash Newington	Australia	19.73	25.17	20.54	25.17	385		4170	22
17	1	Morgan Mathews	United States	23.46	25.02	24.43	25.02	383		3430	26
18	2	Patricia Stabach	United States	20.40	23.06	24.38	24.38	371		3164	27
19	2	Natalia Price	Russia	F	23.58	23.94	23.94	362		4681	19
20	1	Anissa Ben Taleb	France	21.63	21.52	F	21.63	319		5219	13
21	2	Romane Franzetti	Switzerland	F	20.19	21.35	21.35	314		4680	20
22	1	Maria Sartin	New Zealand	F	20.37	F	20.37	296		4770	18
23	1	Uxia Pereira Alonso	Spain	F	F	18.85	18.85	268		3047	28
24	2	Holly Platt	Great Britain	18.49	18.32	18.80	18.80	267		3480	25
25	2	Tomara Seid	Panama	16.81	17.44	18.77	18.77	266		3783	24
26	2	Mckenna Rettew	United States	13.66	18.13	17.01	18.13	254		3010	29
27	2	Daniela Alejandro	Puerto Rico	17.77	F	16.31	17.77	248		5088	14
28	1	Carlier Lalie	France	F	15.47	13.57	15.47	205		4616	21
29	2	Sarah Hopkins	United States	14.92	14.52	14.03	14.92	195		4938	16

=== 1500 metres ===
The 1500 metres was the last event taking place on 4 August 2024.

Rank	Heat	Athlete	Nation	Time	Points	Notes	Overall points	Overall rank
1	1	Corinn Brewer	United States	4:56.39	850		6441	8
2	1	Maria Sartin	New Zealand	5:01.65	816		5586	15
3	1	Ariana Brugger	Switzerland	5:03.51	803		6488	7
4	1	Adeline Audigier	France	5:09.67	764		6594	5
5	1	Carlier Lalie	France	5:14.45	733		5349	18
6	1	Allison Halverson	Armenia	5:18.08	711		7236	1
7	1	Emily Swanson	United States	5:24.93	669		6721	4
8	1	Lara O'Byrne	Ireland	5:26.54	660		6570	6
9	2	Daniela Alejandro	Puerto Rico	5:27.37	655		5743	13
10	1	Anaik Previdi	France	5:27.52	654		6390	9
11	1	Amanda Pasko	United States	5:27.71	653		5476	16
12	1	Jordyn Bruce	United States	5:33.53	619		6723	3
13	1	Michaela Wenning	United States	5:42.06	570		6206	11
14	2	Dash Newington	Australia	5:54.00	506		4676	22
15	1	Anissa Ben Taleb	France	5:54.94	501		5720	14
16	1	Patricia Mehlich	France	5:55.62	497		6128	12
17	2	Sarah Hopkins	United States	5:59.87	475		5413	17
18	2	Natalia Price	Russia	6:00.26	473		5154	20
19	1	Roseva Bidois	France	6:03.28	458		6962	2
20	1	Laura Mathews	United States	6:06.85	440		6258	10
21	2	Romane Franzetti	Switzerland	6:16.18	395		5075	21
22	2	Tomara Seid	Panama	6:21.44	371		4154	24
23	2	Mckenna Rettew	United States	6:23.83	360		3370	28
24	2	Caitlin Davis	United States	6:24.80	356		4444	23
25	1	Morgan Mathews	United States	6:39.33	294		3724	25
26	1	Brittany Bishop	United States	6:51.21	247		5228	19
27	2	Patricia Stabach	United States	7:00.29	214		3378	27
28	2	Holly Platt	Great Britain	7:06.05	194		3674	26
--	1	Uxia Pereira Alonso	Spain	DNF	0		3047	30

== Overall results ==
Key

The highest mark recorded in each event is highlighted in yellow.

Key:	CR	Championship record	AR	Area record	NR	National record	PB	Personal best	SB	Seasonal best	DNS	Did not start	DNF	Did not finish	NM	No Mark

Rank	Athlete	Nation	Overall points	100 m	LJ	SP	HJ	400 m	100 m H	DT	PV	JT	1500 m
1st place, gold medalist(s)	Allison Halverson	Armenia	7236 NR	968; 11.92	813; 5.88	657; 11.94	783; 1.64	873; 55.86	997; 13.87	359; 24.47	463; 2.73	612; 37.13	711; 5:18.08
2nd place, silver medalist(s)	Roseva Bidois	France	6962	831; 12.65	798; 5.83	750; 13.34	747; 1.61	647; 1:01.33	808; 15.26	746; 44.67	652; 3.23	525; 32.54	458; 6:03.28
3rd place, bronze medalist(s)	Jordyn Bruce	United States	6723	851; 12.54	617; 5.21	621; 11.39	678; 1.55	705; 59.85	953; 14.18	459; 29.82	575; 3.03	645; 38.85	619; 5:33.53
4	Emily Swanson	United States	6721	796; 12.85	683; 5.44	607; 11.18	818; 1.67	690; 1:00.22	848; 14.95	435; 28.55	613; 3.13	562; 34.47	669; 5:24.93
5	Adeline Audigier	France	6594	725; 13.26	677; 5.42	529; 9.99	855; 1.70	648; 1:01.31	790; 15.40	476; 30.72	613; 3.13	517; 32.15	764; 5:09.67
6	Lara O'Byrne	Ireland	6570 NR	797; 12.84	660; 5.36	604; 11.14	747; 1.61	728; 59.28	856; 14.89	441; 28.85	613; 3.13	464; 29.32	660; 5:26.54
7	Ariana Brugger	Switzerland	6488 NR	785; 12.91	540; 4.93	568; 10.59	678; 1.55	691; 1:00.21	773; 15.53	457; 29.73	652; 3.23	541; 33.38	803; 5:03.51
8	Corinn Brewer	United States	6441	696; 13.43	601; 5.15	486; 9.34	610; 1.49	721; 59.45	727; 15.90	447; 29.17	774; 3.53	529; 32.74	850; 4:56.39
9	Anaik Previdi	France	6390	819; 12.72	703; 5.51	503; 9.59	783; 1.64	625; 1:01.90	763; 15.61	394; 26.35	692; 3.33	454; 28.79	654; 5:27.52
10	Laura Mathews	United States	6258	945; 12.04	706; 5.52	536; 10.10	644; 1.52	772; 58.21	974; 14.03	450; 29.36	392; 2.53	399; 25.91	440; 6:06.85
11	Michaela Wenning	United States	6206	822; 12.70	626; 5.24	654; 11.90	678; 1.55	693; 1:00.15	844; 14.98	389; 26.06	427; 2.63	503; 31.40	570; 5:42.06
12	Patricia Mehlich	France	6128	844; 12.58	589; 5.11	612; 11.26	610; 1.49	697; 1:00.06	898; 14.58	490; 31.47	392; 2.53	499; 31.20	497; 5:55.62
13	Daniela Alejandro	Puerto Rico	5743 NR	805; 12.80	686; 5.45	438; 8.59	818; 1.67	701; 59.96	777; 15.50	290; 20.65	325; 2.33	248; 17.77	655; 5:27.37
14	Anissa Ben Taleb	France	5720	822; 12.70	637; 5.28	584; 10.83	610; 1.49	644; 1:01.41	804; 15.29	336; 23.19	463; 2.73	319; 21.63	501; 5:54.94
15	Maria Sartin	New Zealand	5586 NR	839; 12.61	677; 5.42	458; 8.91	419; 1.31	789; 57.81	735; 15.83	327; 22.73	230; 2.03	296; 20.37	816; 5:01.65
16	Amanda Pasko	United States	5476	670; 13.59	565; 5.02	467; 9.05	610; 1.49	541; 1:04.20	659; 16.46	321; 22.39	500; 2.83	490; 30.69	653; 5:27.71
17	Sarah Hopkins	United States	5413	824; 12.69	665; 5.38	360; 7.39	610; 1.49	633; 1:01.69	792; 15.38	207; 16.02	652; 3.23	195; 14.92	475; 5:59.87
18	Carlier Lalie	France	5349	755; 13.08	645; 5.31	469; 9.08	512; 1.40	599; 1:02.60	740; 15.79	431; 28.32	260; 2.13	205; 15.47	733; 5:14.45
19	Brittany Bishop	United States	5228	747; 13.13	474; 4.68	512; 9.74	389; 1.28	389; 1:08.75	764; 15.60	404; 26.89	858; 3.73	444; 28.30	247; 6:51.21
20	Natalia Price	Russia	5154	625; 13.87	543; 4.94	526; 9.95	544; 1.43	451; 1:06.81	539; 17.52	276; 19.88	815; 3.63	362; 23.94	473; 6:00.26
21	Romane Franzetti	Switzerland	5075	721; 13.28	418; 4.46	499; 9.54	577; 1.46	470; 1:06.24	639; 16.63	350; 23.99	692; 3.33	314; 21.35	395; 6:16.18
22	Dash Newington	Australia	4676	420; 15.27	472; 4.67	377; 7.65	544; 1.43	432; 1:07.39	430; 18.58	377; 25.41	733; 3.43	385; 25.17	506; 5:54.00
23	Caitlin Davis	United States	4444	629; 13.84	384; 4.32	415; 8.24	481; 1.37	400; 1:08.42	380; 19.11	290; 20.69	652; 3.23	457; 28.98	356; 6:24.80
24	Tomara Seid	Panama	4154	533; 14.47	503; 4.79	301; 6.46	449; 1.34	335; 1:10.59	542; 17.49	241; 17.93	613; 3.13	266; 18.77	371; 6:21.44
25	Morgan Mathews	United States	3724	533; 14.47	369; 4.26	472; 9.12	512; 1.40	365; 1:09.57	366; 19.27	430; 28.25	0 --	383; 25.02	294; 6:39.33
26	Holly Platt	Great Britain	3674	649; 13.72	376; 4.29	267; 5.94	419; 1.31	275; 1:12.77	473; 18.15	217; 16.59	537; 2.93	267; 18.80	194; 7:06.05
27	Patricia Stabach	United States	3378	573; 14.20	333; 4.11	393; 7.90	331; 1.22	256; 1:13.48	343; 19.52	239; 17.82	325; 2.33	371; 24.38	214; 7:00.29
28	Mckenna Rettew	United States	3370	639; 13.78	270; 3.83	274; 6.04	331; 1.22	369; 1:09.43	305; 19.97	276; 19.91	292; 2.23	254; 18.13	360; 6:23.83
29	Uxia Pereira Alonso	Spain	3047	859; 12.50	535; 4.91	530; 10.01	577; 1.46	0 --	0 --	278; 20.00	0 --	268; 18.85	0 --
