= Armenia at the 2009 World Championships in Athletics =

- WA code: ARM
- National federation: Athletic Federation of Armenia
- Website: www1.armatletika.am

in Berlin
- Competitors: 2
- Medals: Gold 0 Silver 0 Bronze 0 Total 0

World Championships in Athletics appearances
- 1993; 1995; 1997; 1999; 2001; 2003; 2005; 2007; 2009; 2011; 2013; 2015; 2017; 2019; 2022; 2023

Armenia fielded two competitors at the 2009 World Championships in Athletics in Berlin. Both athletes also competed at the 2008 Olympic Games.

== Team selection ==
Track and road events

Event	Athletes	
Event	Men	Women
100 metres		Ani Khachikyan

Field and combined events

Event	Athletes	
Event	Men	Women
Javelin throw	Melik Janoyan	

== Results ==
=== Men ===
Event	Athletes	Qualification		Final	
Event	Athletes	Result	Rank	Result	Rank
Javelin throw	Melik Janoyan	74.74 SB	32	did not advance	

=== Women ===
Event	Athletes	Heats		Quarterfinals		Semifinal		Final	
Event	Athletes	Result	Rank	Result	Rank	Result	Rank	Result	Rank
100 m	Ani Khachikyan	12.30 SB	44	did not advance					
