= Kristine Harutyunyan =

Armenian javelin thrower

Kristine Harutyunyan (Armenian: Քրիստինե Հարությունյան), born 18 May 1991 in Leninakan, Armenian SSR, is an Armenian javelin thrower. She competed at the 2012 Summer Olympics in the women's javelin throw. Harutyunyan placed 38th with a mark of 47.65 metres. Her best throw is 49.12 meters, achieved on 21 April 2012 in Adler, Russia. This throw is the Armenian record.
