= Lilit Harutyunyan =

Armenian Track and field athlete (born 1993)

Personal information
- Born: April 4, 1993 (age 32) Gyumri
- Height: 1.64 m (5 ft 4 1/2 in)
- Weight: 55 kg (121 lb)

Sport
- Country: Armenia
- Sport: Track and field
- Event: 400m hurdles

Lilit Harutyunyan (Armenian: Լիլիթ Հարությունյան, born April 4, 1993, in Gyumri) is an Armenian track and field athlete who competes in the 400 metres hurdles. She competed at the 2016 Summer Olympics.

== Personal Bests ==
Discipline	Rank	Result	Date	Location
400m	2	56.90s	16 May 2015	Artashat
1500m	10	4:51.95	22 Jun 2014	Tbilisi
400m Hurdles	1	56.15s	29 May 2016	Artashat
800m	5	2:09.70	27 Feb 2016	Istanbul
