= Ani Khachikyan (sprinter) =

Armenian sprinter

Ani Khachikyan (Armenian: Անի Խաչիկյան, born March 16, 1991, in Yerevan, Armenian SSR) is an Armenian track and field sprinter. She was the national junior record holder for the 100 metres event.

She competed at the 2008 Summer Olympics in the women's 100 metres. Khachikyan placed sixth in her heat without advancing to the second round. She ran the distance in a time of 12.76 seconds.
