= Gayane Chiloyan =

Armenian Olympic sprinter

Gayane Chiloyan (Armenian: Գայանե Չիլոյան, born 27 September 2000 in Yerevan) is an Armenian sprinter. She competed at the 2016 Summer Olympics in the women's 200 metres race; her time of 25.03 seconds in the heats did not qualify her for the semifinals.
