= Armenia at the 2012 European Athletics Championships =

Armenia was represented by five athletes at the 2012 European Athletics Championships in Helsinki.

== Results ==
=== Men ===
==== Field ====
Event	Athletes	Qualification		Final	
Event	Athletes	Result	Rank	Result	Rank
Long jump	Vardan Pahlevanyan	7.67	24	DNQ	
Long jump	Arsen Sargsyan	7.47	29	DNQ	
Javelin throw	Melik Janoyan	72.59	21	DNQ	

=== Women ===
==== Track ====
Event	Athletes	Heats		Semifinal		Final	
Event	Athletes	Result	Rank	Result	Rank	Result	Rank
400 m hurdles	Amaliya Sharoyan	58.27	24	DNQ			

==== Field ====
Event	Athletes	Qualification		Final	
Event	Athletes	Result	Rank	Result	Rank
Javelin throw	Kristine Harutyunyan	45.83	23	DNQ	
