= Armenia at the 2010 European Athletics Championships =

Sporting event delegation

Armenia was represented by 3 athletes at the 2010 European Athletics Championships held in Barcelona, Spain.

== Participants ==
=== Men ===
==== Track and field events ====
| Athlete | Events | Heat | | Semifinal | | Final | |
| Athlete | Events | Result | Rank | Result | Rank | Result | Rank |
|---|---|---|---|---|---|---|---|
| Arman Andreasyan | 100 m | 11.01 | 33 | Did not advance | | | |

==== Field events ====
| Event | Athletes | Qualification | | Final | |
| Event | Athletes | Result | Rank | Result | Rank |
|---|---|---|---|---|---|
| Long jump | Arsen Sargsyan | 7.60 | 25 | Did not advance | |

=== Women ===
==== Track and road events ====
| Athlete | Events | Heat | | Semifinal | | Final | |
| Athlete | Events | Result | Rank | Result | Rank | Result | Rank |
|---|---|---|---|---|---|---|---|
| Amaliya Sharoyan | 400 m hurdles | 1:03.37 | 32 | Did not advance | | | |

== Results ==
| 2010 Barcelona | Gold | Silver | Bronze | Total |
| Armenia (ARM) | 0 | 0 | 0 | 0 |
