= Yervand Mkrtchyan =

Armenian middle-distance runner

Personal information
- Nationality: Armenian
- Born: 11 June 1996 (age 30)
- Height: 180 cm (5 ft 11 in)
- Weight: 69 kg (152 lb)

Sport
- Sport: Track, Athletics
- Events: 1500 metres, 3000 metres
- Club: Gyumri Athletics Sports School, Shirak Runners Club
Medal record
Men's athletics
Representing Armenia
Summer World University Games
Bronze medal – third place	2021 Chengdu	1500 m

Yervand Mkrtchyan (Armenian: Երվանդ Մկրտչյան; born 11 June 1996, Shirak region, Jradzor) is an Armenian middle and long-distance runner. An eighteen time national champion (2025), he is the Armenian national record holder for the 800, 1000, 1500 metres and 3000 metres. He is also a four time Balkan Athletics Championships winner, having won the 1500 metres six times and the 3000 metres once. Mkrtchyan also competed in the 1500 metres at the 2022, 2023 and 2025 World Athletics Championships as well as in the 2024 World Athletics Indoor Championships. He also competed in the 800m at the Paris 2024 Olympic Games, where he set a national record. Yervand Mkrtchyan's coach is Grigor Barseghyan

== Personal bests ==
- 800 metres – 1:49.91 (Paris 2024) NR
- 1500 metres – 3:38.12i (Belgrade 2024) NR
- 1500 metres – 3:37.80 (Lyon 2026) NR
- 3000 metres – 7:55.51i (Belgrade 2026) NR
- 3000 metres – 7:52.75 (Volos 2026) NR
- 5000 metres – 14:23.92 (Chorzów 2023)
- 3000 metres steeplechase – 8:50.35 (Berlin 2018)
