= Amaliya Sharoyan =

Armenian athlete

Personal information
- Born: 19 June 1988 (age 37) Yerevan

Sport
- Sport: Athletics
- Event(s): 400 m, 400 m hurdles

Amaliya Sharoyan (Armenian: Ամալյա Շառոյան; born 19 June 1988 in Yerevan) is an Armenian athlete competing in the 400 metres and 400 metres hurdles. She represented her country at three outdoor and two indoor World Championships.

== Competition record ==
Year	Competition	Venue	Position	Event	Notes
Representing Armenia
2010	European Championships	Barcelona, Spain	32nd (h)	400 m hurdles	63.37
2011	European Indoor Championships	Paris, France	15th (h)	400 m	56.08
2011	World Championships	Daegu, South Korea	32nd (h)	400 m hurdles	58.54
2012	World Indoor Championships	Istanbul, Turkey	21st (h)	400 m	56.41
2012	European Championships	Helsinki, Finland	24th (h)	400 m hurdles	58.27
2013	European Indoor Championships	Gothenburg, Sweden	20th (h)	400 m	56.35
2013	World Championships	Moscow, Russia	26th (h)	400 m hurdles	57.97
2013	Jeux de la Francophonie	Nice, France	9th (h)	400 m hurdles	59.90
2014	European Championships	Zurich, Switzerland	28th (h)	400 m	56.49
2015	European Indoor Championships	Prague, Czech Republic	23rd (h)	400 m	54.24
2015	World Championships	Beijing, China	40th (h)	400 m	54.16
2016	World Indoor Championships	Portland, OR, United States	14th (h)	400 m	55.13
2016	Olympic Games	Rio de Janeiro, Brazil	35th (q)	Long jump	5.95 m
2017	European Indoor Championships	Belgrade, Serbia	29th (h)	400 m	56.07

== Personal bests ==
Outdoor

- 400 metres – 53.48 (Adler 2015)
- 400 metres hurdles – 57.97 (Moscow 2013)

Indoor

- 400 metres – 54.24 (Prague 2015)
