= Armenian Athletic Federation =

Armenian sports association

- Հայաստանի Աթլետիկայի Ֆեդերացիա
- Sport: Athletics
- Abbreviation: HAF
- Affiliation: World Athletics
- Regional affiliation: EAA
- Headquarters: Yerevan
- President: Robert Emmiyan
- Secretary: Narine Shahbazyan

Official website
- armatletika.am
- (Armenia)

The Armenian Athletic Federation (Armenian: Հայաստանի Աթլետիկայի Ֆեդերացիա) is the governing body for the sport of athletics in Armenia. The headquarters of the Federation is located in Yerevan.

== Affiliations ==
The Armenian Athletic Federation is a member of:

- World Athletics
- European Athletic Association (EAA)
- Armenian Olympic Committee

== National records ==
The Armenian Athletic Federation maintains the Armenian records in athletics.

== See also ==
- Sport in Armenia
