= Athletics at the 1972 Summer Olympics – Men's decathlon =

Men's Decathlon at the Games of the XX Olympiad
- Venue: Olympic Stadium
- Dates: 7 & 8 September 1972
- Competitors: 33 from 19 nations
- Winning points: 8466 WR

Medalists
1st place, gold medalist(s)		Mykola Avilov; Soviet Union
2nd place, silver medalist(s)		Leonid Lytvynenko; Soviet Union
3rd place, bronze medalist(s)		Ryszard Katus; Poland

The men's decathlon combined event at the 1972 Olympic Games took place on 7 & 8 September. The favorite was Joachim Kirst, who had won the European Championship in 1969 and 1971. The decathletes were unfortunate, as they had to re-open the Olympics, the morning after the postponement due to the tragic events of the Munich massacre. As the events continued the favorite, Kirst, hit the third hurdle in the 110 metres and fell, dropping out of the race.

== Results ==
=== 100m ===
Rank	Name	Nationality	Heat	Time	Points
1	Tadeusz Janczenko	Poland	2	10.64	895
2	Peter Gabbett	Great Britain	3	10.65	893
3	Jeff Bennett	United States	1	10.73	872
4	Ryszard Skowronek	Poland	1	10.78	859
5	Ruedi Mangisch	Switzerland	5	10.79	857
6	Stefan Schreyer	East Germany	1	10.82	849
7	Ryszard Katus	Poland	1	10.89	831
8	Yves Le Roy	France	3	10.94	819
9	Sepp Zeilbauer	Austria	2	10.97	812
10T	Mykola Avilov	Soviet Union	2	11.00	804
10T	Freddy Herbrand	Belgium	4	11.00	804
12	Steen Smidt-Jensen	Denmark	3	11.07	787
13	József Bakai	Hungary	2	11.08	785
14	Jeff Bannister	United States	2	11.09	783
15T	Hans-Joachim Walde	West Germany	1	11.11	778
15T	Jean-Pierre Schoebel	France	5	11.11	778
17	Joachim Kirst	East Germany	2	11.12	775
18	Leonid Lytvynenko	Soviet Union	1	11.13	773
19	Clifford Brooks	Barbados	5	11.19	759
20	Boris Ivanov	Soviet Union	2	11.24	747
21	Roger Lespagnard	Belgium	3	11.27	740
22	Barry King	Great Britain	4	11.32	728
23	Hans-Joachim Perk	West Germany	5	11.34	724
24T	Bruce Jenner	United States	1	11.35	721
24T	Heinz Born	Switzerland	4	11.35	721
24T	Vijay Singh Chauhan	India	4	11.35	721
27	Régis Ghesquière	Belgium	5	11.45	699
28	Gerry Moro	Canada	4	11.49	690
29	Lennart Hedmark	Sweden	1	11.53	681
30	Radu Gavrilaş	Romania	3	11.57	672
31	Luis Flores	Guatemala	5	11.59	668
32	Horst Beyer	West Germany	2	11.64	657
33	Wilfred Mwalawanda	Malawi	3	11.95	591

=== Long Jump ===
Rank	Name	Nationality	Jump 1	Jump 2	Jump 3	Mark	Points
1	Mykola Avilov	Soviet Union	7.68	x	x	7.68	957
2	Joachim Kirst	East Germany	x	7.59	7.29	7.59	939
3	Stefan Schreyer	East Germany	7.44	x	7.26	7.44	909
4	Ryszard Skowronek	Poland	7.25	7.42	x	7.42	905
5	Yves Le Roy	France	7.08	7.29	7.32	7.32	885
6	Freddy Herbrand	Belgium	7.30	7.26	7.21	7.30	881
7	Tadeusz Janczenko	Poland	7.01	7.26	7.28	7.28	877
8	Jeff Bennett	United States	7.13	7.15	7.26	7.26	873
9	Régis Ghesquière	Belgium	6.98	7.03	7.21	7.21	863
10	Jeff Bannister	United States	7.15	7.20	7.16	7.20	861
11	Peter Gabbett	Great Britain	6.87	x	7.19	7.19	859
T12	Hans-Joachim Walde	West Germany	6.60	6.74	7.16	7.16	853
T12	Sepp Zeilbauer	Austria	x	6.79	7.16	7.16	853
T12	József Bakai	Hungary	7.05	7.16	x	7.16	853
15	Ryszard Katus	Poland	x	x	7.09	7.09	838
16	Barry King	Great Britain	7.03	7.06	x	7.06	832
17	Roger Lespagnard	Belgium	6.86	7.01	6.96	7.01	822
18	Steen Smidt-Jensen	Denmark	6.77	6.95	6.89	6.95	810
19	Ruedi Mangisch	Switzerland	6.82	x	6.94	6.94	808
T20	Vijay Singh Chauhan	India	6.82	x	6.92	6.92	804
T20	Heinz Born	Switzerland	x	6.92	x	6.92	804
22	Gerry Moro	Canada	6.86	6.91	6.88	6.91	802
23	Radu Gavrilaş	Romania	6.90	6.71	x	6.90	800
T24	Jean-Pierre Schoebel	France	6.42	6.89	6.53	6.89	798
T24	Lennart Hedmark	Sweden	6.78	x	6.89	6.89	798
26	Hans-Joachim Perk	West Germany	x	x	6.82	6.82	782
T27	Clifford Brooks	Barbados	6.64	6.81	5.23		
T27	Leonid Lytvynenko	Soviet Union	6.81	6.57	6.71	6.81	780
29	Boris Ivanov	Soviet Union	6.59	6.26	6.57	6.59	734
30	Bruce Jenner	United States	6.49	6.53	6.46	6.53	721
T31	Horst Beyer	West Germany	x	x	6.51	6.51	717
T31	Luis Flores	Guatemala	6.51	6.02	x	6.51	717
33	Wilfred Mwalawanda	Malawi	x	x	5.68	5.68	533

=== Shot put ===
Rank	Name	Nationality	Throw 1	Throw 2	Throw 3	Mark	Points
1	Joachim Kirst	East Germany	16.09	x	x	16.09	852
2	József Bakai	Hungary	15.10	15.50	15.84	15.84	838
3	Barry King	Great Britain	15.25	15.29	15.28	15.29	806
4	Stefan Schreyer	East Germany	15.02	x	14.74	15.02	790
5	Hans-Joachim Walde	West Germany	14.09	13.03	14.57	14.57	763
6	Boris Ivanov	Soviet Union	14.23	14.47	x	14.47	757
7	Tadeusz Janczenko	Poland	14.21	14.19	14.45	14.45	756
8	Lennart Hedmark	Sweden	14.43	x	x	14.43	754
T9	Vijay Singh Chauhan	India	13.23	14.42	x	14.42	754
T9	Horst Beyer	West Germany	13.66	13.76	14.42	14.42	754
11	Ryszard Katus	Poland	14.39	x	x	14.39	752
12	Mykola Avilov	Soviet Union	14.14	x	14.36	14.36	750
13	Régis Ghesquière	Belgium	13.57	13.89	14.32	14.32	747
14	Ryszard Skowronek	Poland	14.24	x	x	14.24	743
15	Jeff Bannister	United States	14.21	13.51	x	14.21	741
16	Leonid Lytvynenko	Soviet Union	x	13.98	14.18	14.18	739
17	Gerry Moro	Canada	13.77	13.99	x	13.99	727
18	Freddy Herbrand	Belgium	13.67	x	13.91	13.91	722
19	Yves Le Roy	France	13.90	13.61	13.90	13.90	722
20	Jean-Pierre Schoebel	France	13.79	13.62	13.04	13.79	715
21	Peter Gabbett	Great Britain	13.46	x	13.59	13.59	702
22	Bruce Jenner	United States	13.27	13.54	13.56	13.56	700
23	Sepp Zeilbauer	Austria	13.49	13.30	x	13.49	696
24	Steen Smidt-Jensen	Denmark	13.18	12.32	13.35	13.35	687
25	Hans-Joachim Perk	West Germany	14.09	12.55	13.34	13.34	686
26	Heinz Born	Switzerland	12.24	12.75	13.06	13.06	669
27	Roger Lespagnard	Belgium	x	12.66	12.92	12.92	660
28	Jeff Bennett	United States	11.54	12.82	12.06	12.82	653
29	Radu Gavrilaş	Romania	12.44	12.47	12.65	12.65	642
T30	Ruedi Mangisch	Switzerland	11.43	12.27	x	12.27	617
T30	Wilfred Mwalawanda	Malawi	12.27	12.19	x	12.27	617
32	Luis Flores	Guatemala	10.24	8.89	11.78	11.78	584
33	Clifford Brooks	Barbados	11.71	11.46	x	11.71	580

=== High jump ===
All heights in metres.

Rank	Name	Nationality	Mark	Points	1.60	1.65	1.70	1.75	1.80	1.83	1.86	1.89	1.92	1.95	1.98	2.01	2.04	2.06	2.08	2.10	2.12	2.14
1	Mykola Avilov	Soviet Union	2.12	959	p	p	p	p	p	p	p	p	p	o	p	o	xxo	o	o	o	o	xxx
2	Joachim Kirst	East Germany	2.10	942	p	p	p	p	p	p	o	p	o	p	xo	o	o	xxo	xo	o	xxx	
3T	Freddy Herbrand	Belgium	2.04	891	p	p	p	p	o	p	p	o	p	o	o	o	o	xxx				
3T	Tadeusz Janczenko	Poland	2.04	891	p	p	p	p	p	p	p	o	p	o	o	o	xxo	xxx				
5T	Sepp Zeilbauer	Austria	2.01	865	p	p	p	p	p	o	p	p	o	o	o	xo	xxx					
5T	Radu Gavrilaş	Romania	2.01	865	p	p	p	p	p	o	p	o	o	o	o	xo	xxx					
5T	Roger Lespagnard	Belgium	2.01	865	p	p	o	p	p	o	p	o	o	xxo	xo	xo	xxx					
5T	Steen Smidt-Jensen	Denmark	2.01	865	p	p	p	p	p	p	p	xo	xo	o	xo	o	xxx					
9T	Heinz Born	Switzerland	1.98	840	p	p	p	p	p	p	o	p	xxo	xo	xxo	xxx						
9T	Ryszard Skowronek	Poland	1.98	840	p	p	p	p	p	p	o	o	o	o	xo	xxx						
11T	Boris Ivanov	Soviet Union	1.92	788	p	p	p	p	o	p	o	p	xo	xxx								
11T	Bruce Jenner	United States	1.92	788	p	p	p	p	xo	p	o	o	xo	xxx								
11T	Hans-Joachim Walde	West Germany	1.92	788	p	p	p	p	p	xo	xxo	xo	xxo	xxx								
11T	Ryszard Katus	Poland	1.92	788	p	p	p	p	o	p	o	o	o	xxx								
11T	Stefan Schreyer	East Germany	1.92	788	p	p	o	p	o	o	o	o	o	xxx								
16T	Barry King	Great Britain	1.89	760	p	o	o	o	o	o	o	xxo	xxx									
16T	József Bakai	Hungary	1.89	760	p	p	p	o	o	p	xo	xo	xxx									
16T	Leonid Lytvynenko	Soviet Union	1.89	760	p	p	p	o	o	xxo	o	xo	xxx									
16T	Régis Ghesquière	Belgium	1.89	760	p	p	p	p	p	o	xxo	xxo	xxx									
16T	Ruedi Mangisch	Switzerland	1.89	760	p	p	o	p	o	o	o	xxo	xxx									
21T	Gerry Moro	Canada	1.86	734	o	o	o	xo	o	xxo	xxo	xxx										
21T	Jeff Bannister	United States	1.86	734	p	p	p	p	p	xxo	o	xxx										
21T	Jeff Bennett	United States	1.86	734	p	p	o	o	o	o	o	xxx										
21T	Peter Gabbett	Great Britain	1.86	734	p	p	o	o	o	xo	xo	xxx										
25T	Vijay Singh Chauhan	India	1.80	680	o	o	o	xo	xo	xxx												
25T	Yves Le Roy	France	1.80	680	p	o	p	xo	xo	xpp												
27T	Luis Flores	Guatemala	1.75	634	o	o	xo	o	xxx													
27T	Clifford Brooks	Barbados	1.75	634	p	o	o	xxo	xxx													
29	Wilfred Mwalawanda	Malawi	1.65	540	xo	xxo	xxx															
30	Jean-Pierre Schoebel	France	1.60	493	o	p	xxx															

=== 400m ===
Rank	Name	Nationality	Heat	Time	Points
1	Peter Gabbett	Great Britain	3	46.10	994
2	Jeff Bennett	United States	1	46.25	984
3	Jeff Bannister	United States	2	46.79	958
4	Ruedi Mangisch	Switzerland	5	47.59	918
5	Ryszard Skowronek	Poland	1	48.08	893
6	Leonid Lytvynenko	Soviet Union	1	48.40	880
7	Mykola Avilov	Soviet Union	2	48.45	875
8	Yves Le Roy	France	3	48.73	866
9	Sepp Zeilbauer	Austria	2	48.77	861
10	Joachim Kirst	East Germany	2	48.90	856
11	Tadeusz Janczenko	Poland	2	49.06	847
12	Ryszard Katus	Poland	1	49.11	847
13	Régis Ghesquière	Belgium	5	49.13	847
14	Jean-Pierre Schoebel	France	5	49.23	842
15	Bruce Jenner	United States	1	49.49	829
16 T	Stefan Schreyer	East Germany	1	49.51	829
16T	Roger Lespagnard	Belgium	3	49.51	829
18	Clifford Brooks	Barbados	5	49.75	814
19	Freddy Herbrand	Belgium	4	49.78	814
20	Vijay Singh Chauhan	India	4	49.89	810
21	Heinz Born	Switzerland	4	50.01	805
22	Barry King	Great Britain	4	50.05	801
23	Steen Smidt-Jensen	Denmark	3	50.13	801
24	Boris Ivanov	Soviet Union	2	50.18	797
25	József Bakai	Hungary	2	50.88	766
26	Radu Gavrilaş	Romania	3	50.90	766
27	Luis Flores	Guatemala	5	50.97	762
28	Gerry Moro	Canada	4	52.02	720
29	Wilfred Mwalawanda	Malawi	3	52.68	691

=== 110m hurdles ===
Rank	Name	Nationality	Heat	Time	Points
1	Mykola Avilov	Soviet Union	2	14.31	926
2	Ryszard Katus	Poland	1	14.41	914
3	Steen Smidt-Jensen	Denmark	3	14.65	887
4	Boris Ivanov	Soviet Union	2	14.76	874
5	Freddy Herbrand	Belgium	4	14.87	862
6	Stefan Schreyer	East Germany	1	15.00	848
7	Vijay Singh Chauhan	India	4	15.01	847
8	Leonid Lytvynenko	Soviet Union	1	15.03	845
9T	Sepp Zeilbauer	Austria	2	15.13	835
9T	Radu Gavrilaş	Romania	3	15.13	835
11	Jean-Pierre Schoebel	France	5	15.30	817
12	Yves Le Roy	France	3	15.34	813
13	Heinz Born	Switzerland	4	15.39	808
14	Peter Gabbett	Great Britain	3	15.47	800
15	Jeff Bennett	United States	1	15.58	789
16	Bruce Jenner	United States	1	15.59	788
17	Régis Ghesquière	Belgium	5	15.68	779
18	Ruedi Mangisch	Switzerland	5	15.71	776
19	Ryszard Skowronek	Poland	1	15.74	773
20	Roger Lespagnard	Belgium	3	15.84	764
21	Gerry Moro	Canada	4	16.28	723
22	Clifford Brooks	Barbados	5	16.37	715
23	József Bakai	Hungary	2	16.50	703
24	Barry King	Great Britain	4	16.61	694
25	Tadeusz Janczenko	Poland	2	16.89	670
26	Luis Flores	Guatemala	5	17.44	625
27	Wilfred Mwalawanda	Malawi	3	18.54	543
-	Jeff Bannister	United States	2	DQ	0
-	Joachim Kirst	East Germany	2	DNF	0

=== Discus throw ===
All distance are in metres.

Rank	Name	Nationality	Mark	Throw 1	Throw 2	Throw 3	Points
1	József Bakai	Hungary	51.46	48.40	51.20	51.46	897
2	Leonid Lytvynenko	Soviet Union	47.84	47.84	x	44.10	833
3	Freddy Herbrand	Belgium	47.12	47.12	x	x	820
4	Mykola Avilov	Soviet Union	46.98	46.98	43.18	46.40	818
5	Barry King	Great Britain	46.06	x	x	46.06	801
6	Peter Gabbett	Great Britain	45.58	42.36	39.18	45.58	792
7	Régis Ghesquière	Belgium	45.56	45.56	44.10	x	792
8	Tadeusz Janczenko	Poland	45.26	45.26	43.14	x	786
9	Vijay Singh Chauhan	India	45.18	45.18	43.92	41.92	785
10	Stefan Schreyer	East Germany	45.08	45.08	44.68	x	783
11	Steen Smidt-Jensen	Denmark	44.80	41.32	44.80	42.70	778
12	Yves Le Roy	France	44.04	41.92	44.04	43.00	763
13	Ryszard Katus	Poland	43.00	39.00	41.98	43.00	744
14	Bruce Jenner	United States	42.24	x	x	42.24	729
15	Jeff Bannister	United States	42.00	41.32	39.28	42.00	724
16	Boris Ivanov	Soviet Union	41.58	x	41.50	41.58	716
17	Jean-Pierre Schoebel	France	41.14	40.12	40.26	41.14	708
18	Sepp Zeilbauer	Austria	40.84	x	40.84	40.16	702
19	Radu Gavrilaş	Romania	40.52	40.52	39.90	40.18	696
20	Heinz Born	Switzerland	39.34	36.50	39.34	x	672
21	Wilfred Mwalawanda	Malawi	38.82	38.82	38.36	x	662
22	Roger Lespagnard	Belgium	37.86	37.86		36.64	643
23	Ruedi Mangisch	Switzerland	36.92	x	36.92	x	623
24	Jeff Bennett	United States	36.58	x	36.58	36.52	616
25	Luis Flores	Guatemala	35.64	x	33.34	35.64	597
26	Clifford Brooks	Barbados	33.90	33.22	33.90	x	560
27	Ryszard Skowronek	Poland	33.66	33.66	x	x	555

=== Pole vault ===
Rank	Name	Nationality	Mark	Points	3.30	3.40	3.50	3.60	3.70	3.80	3.90	4.00	4.10	4.20	4.30	4.40	4.50	4.55	4.60	4.70	4.80	4.90
1T	Jeff Bennett	United States	4.80	1005	p	p	p	p	p	p	p	p	p	p	p	p	xo	p	p	o	o	xxx
1T	Steen Smidt-Jensen	Denmark	4.80	1005	p	p	p	p	p	p	p	p	p	o	p	o	p	p	xxo	xxo	xo	
3	Roger Lespagnard	Belgium	4.60	957	p	p	p	p	p	p	p	o	p	o	p	xo	o	p	o	xxx		
4T	Bruce Jenner	United States	4.55	945	p	p	p	p	p	p	p	p	o	p	xo	p	xo	o	xxx			
4T	Mykola Avilov	Soviet Union	4.55	945	p	p	p	p	p	p	p	o	p	xo	o	xo	o	xo	xxx			
6T	Ryszard Katus	Poland	4.50	932	p	p	p	p	p	p	p	xo	p	o	p	o	o	p	xxx			
6T	Tadeusz Janczenko	Poland	4.50	932	p	p	p	p	p	o	p	o	p	o	o	xo	xxo	xxx				
6T	Yves Le Roy	France	4.50	932	p	p	p	p	p	p	p	p	p	p	o	p	o	p	p	xxx		
9T	Freddy Herbrand	Belgium	4.40	909	p	p	p	p	p	p	p	xxo	o	o	xo	o	xxx					
9T	Leonid Lytvynenko	Soviet Union	4.40	909	p	p	p	p	p	o	p	o	p	o	xxo	o	xxx					
9T	Radu Gavrilaş	Romania	4.40	909	p	p	p	o	p	o	xo	xo	p	xo	o	o	xxx					
9T	Stefan Schreyer	East Germany	4.40	909	p	p	p	p	p	o	p	o	o	o	o	o	xxx					
13T	Boris Ivanov	Soviet Union	4.30	884	p	p	p	p	p	o	xo	p	xo	o	xxx							
13T	Sepp Zeilbauer	Austria	4.30	884	p	p	p	o	p	p	p	o	o	o	o	p	xxx					
15	Jean-Pierre Schoebel	France	4.20	859	p	p	p	p	p	p	p	o	p	o	p	xxx						
16T	Heinz Born	Switzerland	4.00	807	p	p	p	xo	p	o	p	o	p	xxx								
16T	Jeff Bannister	United States	4.00	807	p	p	p	o	p	xxo	p	p	xxx									
16T	József Bakai	Hungary	4.00	807	p	p	p	p	p	p	p	o	p	p	xxx							
19	Barry King	Great Britain	3.90	780	o	o	p	xo	o	o	xo	xxx										
20	Régis Ghesquière	Belgium	3.80	754	p	p	p	p	p	o	xxx											
21	Vijay Singh Chauhan	India	3.70	728	xxo	xo	o	xo	o	xxx												
22	Peter Gabbett	Great Britain	3.60	700	p	p	p	o	p	xxx												
23	Wilfred Mwalawanda	Malawi	3.30	615	o																	
-	Ruedi Mangisch	Switzerland	NM	0	p	p	p	xxx														
-	Luis Flores	Guatemala	NM	0	xxx																	

=== Javelin throw ===
All distance are in metres.

Rank	Name	Nationality	Mark	Throw 1	Throw 2	Throw 3	Points
1	Wilfred Mwalawanda	Malawi	71.28	71.28	x	x	894
2	Bruce Jenner	United States	66.02	63.20	66.02	60.88	833
3	Boris Ivanov	Soviet Union	64.84	62.45	52.14	64.84	819
4	Sepp Zeilbauer	Austria	64.46	57.66	60.04	64.46	815
5	Tadeusz Janczenko	Poland	63.80	x	62.36	63.80	807
6T	Mykola Avilov	Soviet Union	61.66	x	61.66	57.96	781
6T	Yves Le Roy	France	61.66	49.64	61.66	x	781
8	Régis Ghesquière	Belgium	60.88	56.88	58.82	60.88	772
9	Stefan Schreyer	East Germany	60.70	60.70	x	59.96	770
10	Ryszard Katus	Poland	59.96	55.48	x	59.96	761
11	Leonid Lytvynenko	Soviet Union	58.94	55.02	57.98	58.94	748
12	Barry King	Great Britain	57.74	57.74	53.46	55.04	733
13	Jean-Pierre Schoebel	France	57.54	56.74	57.54	52.96	731
14	Jeff Bennett	United States	56.98	52.00	57.48	49.14	730
15	Radu Gavrilaş	Romania	57.16	57.16	x	x	726
16	Jeff Bannister	United States	56.98	56.98	x	x	724
17	Vijay Singh Chauhan	India	56.34	36.90	48.68	56.34	716
18	Steen Smidt-Jensen	Denmark	55.24	55.24	54.76	55.08	701
19	József Bakai	Hungary	52.18	52.18	x	x	662
20	Roger Lespagnard	Belgium	50.60	50.60	x	46.32	641
21	Freddy Herbrand	Belgium	50.42	x	x	50.42	639
22	Heinz Born	Switzerland	48.72	46.18	48.72	47.90	615
-	Peter Gabbett	Great Britain	NM	x	x	x	0
-	Ruedi Mangisch	Switzerland	NM	x	x	x	0

=== 1500m ===
Rank	Name	Nationality	Heat	Time	Points
1	Leonid Lytvynenko	Soviet Union	3	4:05.9	768
2	Jeff Bennett	United States	1	4:12.2	718
3	Jeff Bannister	United States	1	4:15.8	690
4	Bruce Jenner	United States	2	4:18.9	668
5	Régis Ghesquière	Belgium	2	4:19.4	664
6	Mykola Avilov	Soviet Union	3	4:22.8	639
7	Steen Smidt-Jensen	Denmark	3	4:24.7	626
8	Freddy Herbrand	Belgium	3	4:27.7	605
9	Roger Lespagnard	Belgium	2	4:28.7	598
10	Ryszard Katus	Poland	3	4:31.9	577
11T	Boris Ivanov	Soviet Union	1	4:37.4	541
11T	Wilfred Mwalawanda	Malawi	1	4:37.4	541
13T	Barry King	Great Britain	2	4:38.6	533
13T	Vijay Singh Chauhan	India	2	4:38.6	533
15	Jean-Pierre Schoebel	France	2	4:38.8	532
16	Radu Gavrilaş	Romania	2	4:43.1	506
17	Heinz Born	Switzerland	2	4:47.9	476
18	Stefan Schreyer	East Germany	3	4:48.2	475
19	Sepp Zeilbauer	Austria	3	4:58.2	418
20	Yves Le Roy	France	1	4:58.9	414
21	Tadeusz Janczenko	Poland	3	5:01.5	400
-	József Bakai	Hungary	1	DNF	0

== Final standings ==
Standings after Event 10
8 September 1972
Legend:M = Mark, P = Points

Pos	Athlete	Country	Total Points	Notes	100M	Long Jump	Shot Put	High Jump	400M	110M Hurdles	Discus Throw	Pole Vault	Javelin Throw	1500M
1st place, gold medalist(s)	Mykola Avilov	Soviet Union	8454; WR	P M	804; 11.00	957; 7.68	750; 14.36	959; 2.12	875; 48.50	926; 14.31	818; 46.98	945; 4.55	781; 61.66	639; 4:22.8
2nd place, silver medalist(s)	Leonid Lytvynenko	Soviet Union	8035	P M	773; 11.13	780; 6.81	739; 14.18	760; 1.89	880; 48.40	845; 15.03	833; 48.84	909; 4.40	748; 58.94	768; 4:05.9
3rd place, bronze medalist(s)	Ryszard Katus	Poland	7984	P M	831; 10.89	838; 7.09	752; 14.39	788; 1.92	847; 49.10	914; 14.41	744; 43.00	932; 4.50	761; 59.96	577; 4:31.9
4	Jeff Bennett	United States	7974	P M	872; 10.73	873; 7.26	653; 12.82	734; 1.86	984; 46.30	789; 15.58	616; 36.58	1005; 4.80	730; 57.48	718; 4:12.2
5	Stefan Schreyer	East Germany	7950	P M	849; 10.82	909; 7.44	790; 15.02	788; 1.92	829; 49.50	848; 15.00	783; 45.08	909; 4.40	770; 60.70	475; 4:48.2
6	Freddy Herbrand	Belgium	7947	P M	804; 11.00	881; 7.30	722; 13.91	891; 2.04	814; 49.80	862; 14.87	820; 47.12	909; 4.40	639; 50.42	605; 4:27.7
7	Steen Smidt-Jensen	Denmark	7947	P M	787; 11.07	810; 6.95	687; 13.35	865; 2.01	801; 50.10	887; 14.65	778; 44.80	1005; 4.80	701; 55.24	626; 4:24.7
8	Tadeusz Janczenko	Poland	7861	P M	895; 10.64	877; 7.28	756; 14.45	891; 2.04	847; 49.10	670; 16.89	786; 45.26	932; 4.50	807; 63.80	400; 5:01.5
9	Sepp Zeilbauer	Austria	7741	P M	812; 10.97	853; 7.16	696; 13.49	865; 2.01	861; 48.80	835; 15.15	702; 40.84	884; 4.30	815; 64.46	418; 4:58.2
10	Bruce Jenner	United States	7722	P M	721; 11.35	721; 6.53	700; 13.56	788; 1.92	829; 49.50	788; 15.59	729; 42.24	945; 4.55	833; 66.02	668; 4:18.9
11	Régis Ghesquière	Belgium	7677	P M	699; 11.45	863; 7.21	747; 14.32	760; 1.89	847; 49.10	779; 15.68	792; 45.56	754; 3.80	772; 60.88	664; 4:19.4
12	Yves Le Roy	France	7675	P M	819; 10.94	885; 7.32	722; 13.90	680; 1.80	866; 48.70	813; 15.34	763; 44.04	932; 4.50	781; 61.66	414; 4:58.9
13	Boris Ivanov	Soviet Union	7657	P M	747; 11.24	734; 6.59	757; 14.47	788; 1.92	797; 50.20	874; 14.76	716; 41.58	884; 4.30	819; 64.84	541; 4:37.4
14	Roger Lespagnard	Belgium	7519	P M	740; 11.27	822; 7.01	660; 12.92	865; 2.01	829; 49.50	764; 15.84	643; 37.86	957; 4.60	641; 50.60	598; 4:28.7
15	Barry King	Great Britain	7468	P M	728; 11.32	832; 7.06	806; 15.29	760; 1.89	801; 50.10	694; 16.61	801; 46.06	780; 3.90	733; 57.74	533; 4:38.6
16	Radu Gavrilaş	Romania	7417	P M	672; 11.57	800; 6.90	642; 12.65	865; 2.01	766; 50.90	835; 15.13	696; 40.52	909; 4.40	726; 57.16	506; 4:43.1
17	Vijay Singh Chauhan	India	7378	P M	721; 11.35	804; 6.92	754; 14.42	680; 1.80	810; 49.90	847; 15.01	785; 45.18	728; 3.70	716; 56.34	533; 4:38.6
18	Jean-Pierre Schoebel	France	7273	P M	778; 11.11	798; 6.89	715; 13.79	493; 1.60	842; 49.20	817; 15.30	708; 41.14	859; 4.20	731; 57.54	532; 4:38.8
19	Heinz Born	Switzerland	7217	P M	721; 11.35	804; 6.92	669; 13.06	840; 1.98	805; 50.00	808; 15.39	672; 39.34	807; 4.00	615; 48.72	476; 4:47.9
20	József Bakai	Hungary	7071	P M	785; 11.08	853; 7.16	838; 15.84	760; 1.89	766; 50.90	703; 16.50	897; 51.46	807; 4.00	662; 52.18	0 DNF
21	Jeff Bannister	United States	7022	P M	783; 11.09	861; 7.20	741; 14.21	634; 1.86	958; 46.80	0 DQ	724; 42.00	807; 4.00	724; 56.98	690; 4:15.8
22	Wilfred Mwalawanda	Malawi	6227	P M	591; 11.95	533; 5.68	617; 12.27	540; 1.65	691; 52.70	543; 18.54	662; 38.82	615; 3.30	894; 71.28	541; 4:37.4
	Peter Gabbett	Great Britain	DNF	P M	893; 10.65	859; 7.19	702; 13.59	734; 1.86	994; 46.10	800; 15.47	792; 45.58	700; 3.60	0 NM	
	Ryszard Skowronek	Poland	DNF	P M	859; 10.78	905; 7.42	743; 14.24	840; 1.98	893; 48.10	773; 15.74	555; 33.66	0 NM		
	Ruedi Mangisch	Switzerland	DNF	P M	857; 10.79	808; 6.94	617; 12.27	760; 1.89	918; 47.60	776; 15.71	623; 36.92	0 NM		
	Luis Flores	Guatemala	DNF	P M	668; 11.59	717; 6.51	584; 11.78	634; 1.75	762; 51.00	625; 17.44	597; 35.64	0 NM		
	Clifford Brooks	Barbados	DNF	P M	759; 11.19	780; 6.81	580; 11.71	634; 1.75	814; 49.80	715; 16.37	560; 33.90	0 NM		
	Gerry Moro	Canada	DNF	P M	690; 11.49	802; 6.91	727; 13.99	734; 1.86	720; 52.00	723; 16.28	0 NM			
	Joachim Kirst	East Germany	DNF	P M	775; 11.12	939; 7.59	852; 16.09	942; 2.10	856; 48.90	0 DNF				
	Hans-Joachim Walde	West Germany	DNF	P M	778; 11.11	853; 7.16	763; 14.57	788; 1.92	0 DNF					
	Lennart Hedmark	Sweden	DNF	P M	681; 11.53	798; 6.89	754; 14.43	0 DNF						
	Hans-Joachim Perk	West Germany	DNF	P M	724; 11.34	782; 6.82	686; 13.34	0 DNF						
	Horst Beyer	West Germany	DNF	P M	657; 11.64	717; 6.51	754; 14.42	0 DNF						
	Renato Carnevali	Italy	DNS	P M	0 DNS									

Key: WR = world record; p = pass; x = fault; o = cleared; NM = no mark; DNF = did not finish; DNS = did not start; DQ = disqualified; T = tied
