= 1971 European Athletics Championships – Men's decathlon =

Athletics tournament

Men's decathlon at the European Athletics Championships

The men's decathlon at the 1971 European Athletics Championships was held in Helsinki, Finland, at Helsinki Olympic Stadium on 11 and 12 August 1971.

== Medalists ==
Gold	Joachim Kirst; East Germany
Silver	Lennart Hedmark; Sweden
Bronze	Hans-Joachim Walde; West Germany

== Results ==
KEY:	DNS	Did not start	DNF	Did not finish	CR	Championships record	NR	National record	PB	Personal best	SB	Seasonal best

=== Final ===
11/12 August

The highest mark recorded in each event is highlighted in yellow

Rank	Name	Nationality	100m	LJ	SP	HJ	400m	110m H	DT	PV	JT	1500m	Points	Notes
1st place, gold medalist(s)	Joachim Kirst	East Germany	11.02 (w: 0.3 m/s)	7.68 (w: 0.8 m/s)	16.59	2.13	48.97	16.12 (w: 1.1 m/s)	47.21	4.20	65.51	4:44.7	8188 (8196)	CR
2nd place, silver medalist(s)	Lennart Hedmark	Sweden	11.28 (w: 0.0 m/s)	7.51 (w: 0.8 m/s)	15.37	1.89	49.09	14.78 (w: 0.1 m/s)	45.37	4.20	73.79	4:41.0	8054 (8038)	NR
3rd place, bronze medalist(s)	Hans-Joachim Walde	West Germany	11.17 (w: -0.4 m/s)	7.41 (w: 1.2 m/s)	15.33	1.95	49.32	15.17 (w: 1.6 m/s)	43.57	4.30	66.47	4:41.2	7927 (7951)	
4	Heinz-Ulrich Schulze	West Germany	10.98 (w: -0.9 m/s)	7.11 (w: 0.0 m/s)	14.53	1.89	48.64	14.97 w (w: 2.4 m/s)	42.80	4.30	63.93	4:34.1	7841 (7889)	
5	Sepp Zeilbauer	Austria	10.96 (w: 0.0 m/s)	7.38 (w: 1.7 m/s)	13.49	2.04	48.79	15.06 (w: 0.1 m/s)	39.70	4.00	58.95	4:27.5	7783 (7842)	NR
6	Peter Gabbett	Great Britain	10.85 (w: -0.4 m/s)	7.26 (w: 1.1 m/s)	12.81	1.83	47.18	15.45 (w: 1.6 m/s)	41.81	4.30	58.68	4:29.7	7692 (7754)	
7	Leonid Litvinenko	Soviet Union	11.34 (w: -0.9 m/s)	7.02 (w: -0.2 m/s)	13.50	1.89	49.49	15.10 w (w: 2.4 m/s)	42.82	4.10	63.27	4:19.6	7650 (7707)	
8	Boris Ivanov	Soviet Union	11.28 (w: -0.9 m/s)	6.92 (w: 1.0 m/s)	14.15	1.92	50.63	15.21 w (w: 2.4 m/s)	43.94	4.30	66.59	4:53.6	7554 (7601)	
9	Herbert Wessel	East Germany	11.17 (w: -0.9 m/s)	7.12 (w: -0.4 m/s)	14.70	1.86	49.76	15.46 w (w: 2.4 m/s)	44.52	4.60	55.70	4:57.8	7528 (7583)	
10	József Bákái	Hungary	11.22 (w: -0.4 m/s)	6.96 (w: 1.7 m/s)	15.28	1.83	51.66	16.56 (w: 1.6 m/s)	49.46	4.40	66.83	4:52.7	7520 (7569)	
11	Edward de Noorlander	Netherlands	11.39 (w: 0.0 m/s)	6.94 (w: 0.6 m/s)	13.99	2.01	50.48	15.03 (w: 0.1 m/s)	40.87	4.20	49.28	4:23.2	7478 (7562)	
12	Tadeusz Janczenko	Poland	10.96 (w: 0.0 m/s)	7.54 w (w: 2.1 m/s)	13.65	1.98	50.17	16.61 (w: 0.1 m/s)	42.61	4.40	55.41	5:03.2	7439 (7520)	
13	Yves Le Roy	France	11.12 (w: 0.3 m/s)	7.37 (w: 0.4 m/s)	13.19	1.89	51.15	15.58 (w: 1.1 m/s)	43.69	4.30	59.14	4:59.3	7395 (7453)	
14	Ryszard Katus	Poland	11.17 (w: 0.0 m/s)	7.06 (w: 1.8 m/s)	12.93	1.86	50.83	14.52 (w: 0.1 m/s)	40.20	4.30	55.59	4:48.2	7351 (7417)	
15	Roger Lespagnard	Belgium	11.54 (w: -0.4 m/s)	6.81 (w: 0.4 m/s)	12.90	2.04	50.30	15.86 (w: 1.6 m/s)	38.72	4.50	51.36	4:28.2	7328 (7406)	
16	Vasile Bogdan	Romania	11.40 (w: 0.3 m/s)	6.94 (w: 0.0 m/s)	12.75	1.86	50.20	15.79 (w: 1.1 m/s)	37.41	4.40	63.42	4:33.9	7317 (7376)	
17	Freddy Herbrandt	Belgium	11.04 (w: 0.3 m/s)	7.45 (w: 0.0 m/s)	12.85	1.98	50.43	14.77 (w: 1.1 m/s)	40.14	4.20	46.23	5:13.4	7248 (7328)	
18	Hannu Kyösola	Finland	11.26 (w: 0.0 m/s)	7.34 (w: 1.2 m/s)	13.73	1.75	50.02	15.85 (w: 0.1 m/s)	39.26	3.60	66.96	4:34.0	7282 (7322)	
19	Frank Nusse	Netherlands	11.42 (w: -0.4 m/s)	6.76 (w: 0.0 m/s)	11.73	1.86	49.67	15.14 (w: 1.6 m/s)	36.17	4.50	50.53	4:16.1	7239 (7311)	
20	Régis Ghesquière	Belgium	11.75 (w: 0.3 m/s)	6.86 (w: 0.0 m/s)	13.64	1.86	50.25	15.97 (w: 1.1 m/s)	39.87	3.50	55.85	4:16.3	7063 (7157)	
21	Per Ovesen	Denmark	11.46 (w: -0.9 m/s)	7.04 (w: 0.4 m/s)	13.52	1.86	50.81	16.25 w (w: 2.4 m/s)	37.42	4.00	51.98	4:44.1	6947 (7051)	
22	Rafael Cano	Spain	11.40 (w: -0.9 m/s)	6.76 (w: 0.0 m/s)	11.50	1.83	50.13	15.36 w (w: 2.4 m/s)	32.52	3.80	46.55	4:44.0	6645 (6735)	
23	Franz Biedermann	Liechtenstein	12.04 (w: -0.4 m/s)	6.59 w (w: 3.2 m/s)	10.10	1.75	52.99	16.52 (w: 1.6 m/s)	28.83	4.20	47.75	4:45.2	6112 (6189)	
	Kurt Bendlin	West Germany	11.06 (w: 0.0 m/s)	7.45 (w: 1.6 m/s)	15.03	1.83	48.65	15.45 (w: 0.1 m/s)	45.45	4.60	69.97		DNF	
	Hans Smeman	Netherlands	11.44 (w: -0.9 m/s)	6.55 (w: 0.1 m/s)	13.01	1.86	51.24	DNF	38.82	NM			DNF	
	Nikolay Avilov	Soviet Union	11.81 (w: -0.4 m/s)	6.88 (w: 2.0 m/s)	13.33	1.92	51.77	15.07 (w: 1.6 m/s)					DNF	
	Markku Juhola	Finland	10.72 (w: 0.3 m/s)	7.27 w (w: 2.2 m/s)	13.58	1.70	48.02						DNF	
	Hans-Dieter Michalek	East Germany	11.36 (w: -0.4 m/s)	7.00 (w: 0.0 m/s)	14.16	1.70							DNF	
	Jorma Vesala	Finland	11.48 (w: 0.0 m/s)	5.85 (w: 1.4 m/s)									DNF	
	Ryszard Skowronek	Poland	DNF										DNF	

== Participation ==
According to an unofficial count, 30 athletes from 16 countries participated in the event.

- Austria (1)
- Belgium (3)
- Denmark (1)
- East Germany (3)
- Finland (3)
- France (1)
- Hungary (1)
- Liechtenstein (1)
- Netherlands (3)
- Poland (3)
- Romania (1)
- Soviet Union (3)
- Spain (1)
- Sweden (1)
- Great Britain (1)
- West Germany (3)
