= 1974 European Athletics Championships – Men's decathlon =

Men's decathlon at the European Athletics Championships

The men's decathlon at the 1974 European Athletics Championships was held in Rome, Italy, at Stadio Olimpico on 6 and 7 September 1974.

== Medalists ==
Gold	Ryszard Skowronek; Poland
Silver	Yves Le Roy; France
Bronze	Guido Kratschmer; West Germany

== Results ==
KEY:	DNF	Did not finish	CR	Championships record	NR	National record	PB	Personal best	SB	Seasonal best	w	Wind assisted

=== Final ===
6/7 September

The highest mark recorded in each event is highlighted in yellow

Rank	Name	Nationality	100m	LJ	SP	HJ	400m	110m H	DT	PV	JT	1500m	Points	Notes
1st place, gold medalist(s)	Ryszard Skowronek	Poland	10.97 (w: -0.9 m/s)	7.49 (w: 1.2 m/s)	13.10	1.95	47.90	14.79 (w: 1.0 m/s)	43.26	5.10	64.14	4:30.90	8230 (8207)	CR NR
2nd place, silver medalist(s)	Yves Le Roy	France	10.95 (w: -0.1 m/s)	7.72 w (w: 3.7 m/s)	13.37	1.98	48.41	15.04 w (w: 2.5 m/s)	46.66	4.65	61.42	4:35.5	8144 (8146)	NR
3rd place, bronze medalist(s)	Guido Kratschmer	West Germany	10.83 (w: -0.9 m/s)	7.60 w (w: 3.2 m/s)	13.56	2.01	48.44	14.29 w (w: 2.5 m/s)	42.10	4.20	63.58	4:31.0	8108 (8132)	
4	Leonid Litvinenko	Soviet Union	11.14 (w: 1.0 m/s)	7.01 w (w: 2.4 m/s)	14.60	1.89	48.76	14.64 (w: 0.9 m/s)	45.20	4.40	65.10	4:09.7	8083 (8122)	
5	Ryszard Katus	Poland	11.14 (w: -1.3 m/s)	7.38 w (w: 2.5 m/s)	14.47	1.92	49.62	14.54 (w: 0.9 m/s)	43.06	4.40	64.22	4:41.0	7895 (7920)	
6	Philipp Andres	Switzerland	11.03 (w: 1.0 m/s)	7.08 w (w: 2.8 m/s)	11.98	1.95	47.37	15.30 (w: 0.9 m/s)	38.34	4.60	60.52	4:13.2	7830 (7863)	
7	Sepp Zeilbauer	Austria	11.19 (w: -1.3 m/s)	7.11 w (w: 2.4 m/s)	14.32	2.04	48.66	14.82 w (w: 2.5 m/s)	41.74	4.20	53.73	4:34.8	7725 (7792)	
8	Aleksandr Blinyayev	Soviet Union	11.46 (w: -0.9 m/s)	7.52 (w: 1.0 m/s)	14.36	1.95	51.55	15.63 (w: 1.0 m/s)	47.94	4.50	61.12	4:44.8	7722 (7742)	
9	Eberhard Stroot	West Germany	11.12 (w: -1.3 m/s)	7.19 (w: 2.0 m/s)	13.12	1.92	47.76	15.10 (w: 2.0 m/s)	40.50	4.10	58.42	4:29.2	7641 (7704)	
10	Régis Ghesquière	Belgium	11.68 (w: -1.3 m/s)	7.21 (w: 1.0 m/s)	13.79	1.92	49.79	15.08 (w: 2.0 m/s)	40.52	4.10	61.16	4:25.6	7538 (7591)	
11	Edward Kozakiewicz	Poland	11.35 (w: -0.1 m/s)	7.11 (w: 1.0 m/s)	12.24	1.89	49.75	15.86 (w: 2.0 m/s)	37.68	5.00	56.98	4:29.5	7494 (7522)	
12	Jean-Pierre Schoebel	France	11.26 (w: -0.9 m/s)	6.90 w (w: 3.4 m/s)	13.42	1.83	50.20	15.44 (w: 0.9 m/s)	38.96	4.40	62.82	4:32.0	7428 (7486)	
13	Luděk Pernica	Czechoslovakia	11.45 (w: 1.0 m/s)	6.81 w (w: 2.9 m/s)	13.30	1.85	50.53	15.26 (w: 0.9 m/s)	38.06	4.50	53.86	4:26.6	7294 (7456)	
14	Heikki Kyösola	Finland	11.17 (w: -0.9 m/s)	7.09 w (w: 3.7 m/s)	12.13	1.98	50.38	16.46 (w: 0.9 m/s)	36.20	4.10	64.84	4:31.4	7315 (7384)	
15	Rafael Cano	Spain	11.38 (w: -0.1 m/s)	6.79 (w: 1.0 m/s)	11.24	1.89	49.57	15.49 w (w: 2.5 m/s)	33.58	4.20	54.34	4:43.8	6951 (7024)	
16	Roger Lespagnard	Belgium	11.14 (w: 1.0 m/s)	7.12 (w: 2.0 m/s)	12.78	1.85	49.43	16.17 (w: 1.0 m/s)	37.66	3.80	44.18	4:56.6	6812 (6937)	
17	Raimo Pihl	Sweden	11.01 (w: -0.9 m/s)	7.15 (w: 1.9 m/s)	14.85	1.89	49.75	16.12 (w: 2.0 m/s)	42.22				DNF	
18	Vasile Bogdan	Romania	11.27 (w: -0.1 m/s)	7.10 (w: 0.8 m/s)	13.92	1.86	49.58	28.90 (w: 2.0 m/s)					DNF	
19	Stefan Hallgrímsson	Iceland	11.64 (w: -0.9 m/s)	6.59 (w: 2.0 m/s)	13.65	1.83	50.09	22.28 (w: 1.0 m/s)					DNF	
20	Runald Bäckman	Sweden	10.96 (w: 1.0 m/s)	7.16 w (w: 2.4 m/s)	13.14	1.86							DNF	
21	Heinz Born	Switzerland	11.29 (w: -0.1 m/s)	7.31 w (w: 3.7 m/s)	12.92	1.98							DNF	
22	Rudolf Zigert	Soviet Union	11.17 (w: -1.3 m/s)	7.02 (w: 1.5 m/s)	16.14								DNF	
23	Lennart Hedmark	Sweden	11.41 (w: -0.1 m/s)	7.13 (w: 1.9 m/s)	15.30								DNF	
24	Mauro Bettella	Italy	DNF										DNF	
25	Kurt Bendlin	West Germany	DNS										DNS	

== Participation ==
According to an unofficial count, 24 athletes from 14 countries participated in the event.

- Austria (1)
- Belgium (2)
- Czechoslovakia (1)
- Finland (1)
- France (2)
- Iceland (1)
- Italy (1)
- Poland (3)
- Romania (1)
- Soviet Union (3)
- Spain (1)
- Sweden (3)
- Switzerland (2)
- West Germany (2)
