= Athletics at the 1973 Summer Universiade – Men's decathlon =

The men's decathlon event at the 1973 Summer Universiade was held at the Central Lenin Stadium in Moscow on 18 and 19 August.

== Results ==
The highest mark recorded in each event is highlighted in yellow

Rank	Athlete	Nationality	100m	LJ	SP	HJ	400m	110m H	DT	PV	JT	1500m	Points	Notes
1st place, gold medalist(s)	Ryszard Skowronek	Poland	11.17	7.41	13.62	1.92	48.59	14.84	42.98	4.60	63.84	4:34.15	7964	
2nd place, silver medalist(s)	Mykola Avilov	Soviet Union	11.39	7.21	14.10	2.08	50.39	14.68	43.74	4.40	60.90	4:34.62	7902	
3rd place, bronze medalist(s)	Rudolf Zigert	Soviet Union	11.20	6.90	16.33	2.08	50.95	14.97	47.70	4.20	55.08	4:46.50	7825	
4	Ryszard Katus	Poland	11.09	6.92	13.99	1.89	49.62	14.44	41.30	4.60	56.96	4:45.19	7690	
5	Fred Samara	United States	11.05	6.92	12.04	1.92	50.89	15.44	39.74	4.45	60.22	4:41.83	7432	
6	Stewart McCallum	Great Britain	11.32	7.08	12.16	1.86	48.60	15.25	38.80	4.25	55.66	4:34.50	7400	
7	Petr Krátký	Czechoslovakia	11.64	7.08	14.06	1.86	50.22	15.17	40.14	4.20	52.74	4:29.57	7393	
8	Luděk Pernica	Czechoslovakia	11.68	6.86	12.54	1.89	50.14	15.58	38.84	4.50	56.02	4:23.00	7365	
9	Roger George	United States	11.61	6.87	12.78	1.95	49.04	15.90	37.58	4.00	48.72	4:17.31	7365	
10	András Sepsy	Romania	11.83	6.90	12.62	2.01	51.70	15.13	39.24	4.30	59.02	4:50.1	7254	
11	Junichi Onizuka	Japan	11.18	6.98	13.46	1.89	50.06	15.33	39.00	3.80	55.96	4:53.40	7223	
12	Eltjo Schutter	Netherlands	11.35	7.25	11.53	1.83	48.76	15.59	36.36	4.30	44.02	4:28.30	7164	
13	Bo Sterner	Sweden	11.52	6.71	12.52	1.89	51.41	15.30	45.24	3.80	63.26	4:58.10	7156	
14	Christer Lythell	Sweden	11.51	6.84	11.73	1.89	50.32	15.54	40.68	4.20	56.68	4:52.57	7124	
15	Radu Gavrilaş	Romania	11.73	6.86	12.36	1.92	51.37	15.30	38.08	4.20	56.34	4:57.00	7048	
16	Gordon Stewart	Canada	11.55	6.73	12.54	1.86	51.96	16.22	35.46	4.20	54.60	4:47.97	6878	
17	Franz Biedermann	Liechtenstein											6374	
	Michel Lerouge	France	11.38	6.74	12.09	1.86	50.39	16.19	38.20	?.??	DNS	–	DNF	
	Jean-Pierre Schoebel	France	11.62	6.67	12.49	1.83	50.85	15.84	39.22	?.??	DNS	–	DNF	
	Herbert Swoboda	West Germany	11.17	6.78	13.51	1.83	50.54	16.43	DNS	–	–	–	DNF	
	Mike Bull	Great Britain											DNF	
