= Athletics at the 1970 Summer Universiade – Men's decathlon =

The men's decathlon event at the 1970 Summer Universiade was held at the Stadio Comunale in Turin on 4 and 5 September 1970.

== Results ==
Rank	Athlete	Nationality	100m	LJ	SP	HJ	400m	110m H	DT	PV	JT	1500m	Points	Notes
1st place, gold medalist(s)	Mykola Avilov	Soviet Union	11.3	7.48	13.15	2.09	49.2	14.8	40.86	4.20	55.56	4:33.5	7803	
2nd place, silver medalist(s)	Lennart Hedmark	Sweden	11.5	7.28	14.13	1.88	49.4	14.9	43.70	4.20	69.44	4:35.8	7783	
3rd place, bronze medalist(s)	Vladimir Shcherbatykh	Soviet Union	11.2	7.42	13.14	1.94	50.7	15.1	37.60	4.30	56.62	4:34.5	7551	
4	Luděk Pernica	Czechoslovakia	11.5	6.90	11.79	1.97	49.3	15.6	37.46	4.50	52.56	4:29.1	7356	
5	Rick Wanamaker	United States	11.5	6.40	14.08	1.80	50.7	15.3	42.68	4.30	59.40	4:36.5	7307	
6	Andras Sepsy	Romania	11.7	7.00	12.53	2.06	50.9	15.0	36.42	4.10	51.10	4:52.8	7161	
7	Rafael Cano	Spain	11.3	6.91	11.70	1.88	48.8	15.0	32.78	4.00	56.70	4:42.3	7148	
8	Hannu Kyösola	Finland	11.5	7.41	13.76	1.75	50.4	15.6	37.30	3.40	65.88	4:52.5	7069	
9	Hans-Jürgen Poelke	West Germany	11.8	7.02	13.24	1.94	50.1	15.6	39.60	4.30	59.88	5:39.0	7060	
10	Barry King	Great Britain	11.7	6.96	15.28	1.75	51.2	17.3	45.36	3.40	59.50	4:38.1	7007	
11	Ryszard Skowronek	Poland	11.3	7.07	12.12	1.80	49.3	15.4	41.00	3.80	62.02	5:33.3	6989	
12	Hansruedi Kunz	Switzerland	11.4	6.72	13.83	1.80	50.3	15.9	38.74	3.60	59.96	5:04.3	6923	
13	Yordan Mlyakov	Bulgaria	11.6	6.86	13.67	1.88	53.8	14.7	38.98	4.00	53.76	5:17.8	6914	
14	Jesús Mirabal	Cuba	10.9	6.52	11.01	1.75	49.9	15.0	34.32	3.90	59.38	5:10.7	6827	
15	Daniele Faraggiana	Italy	??.?	?.??	??.??	?.??	??.?	??.?	??.??	?.??	??.??	?:??.?	6741	
16	Jean-Pierre Schoebel	France	11.3	6.56	13.45	1.70	51.2	15.9	35.78	3.80	49.40	4:44.0	6731	
17	Jerri Novikowsky	Austria	??.?	?.??	??.??	?.??	??.?	??.?	??.??	?.??	??.??	?:??.?	6495	
18	Fatmir Dibra	Albania	??.?	?.??	??.??	?.??	??.?	??.?	??.??	?.??	??.??	?:??.?	6372	
	Gert Herunter	Austria	??.?	?.??	??.??	?.??	??.?	??.?	??.??	?.??	??.??	?:??.?	DNF	
	Spas Dzhurov	Bulgaria	??.?	?.??	??.??	?.??	??.?	??.?	??.??	?.??	??.??	?:??.?	DNF	
	Kurt Sokol	Romania	??.?	?.??	??.??	?.??	??.?	??.?	??.??	?.??	??.??	?:??.?	DNF	
	Paulo Matschinske	Brazil	??.?	?.??	??.??	?.??	??.?	??.?	??.??	?.??	??.??	?:??.?	DNF	
	Helmut Grolmann	West Germany	??.?	?.??	??.??	?.??	??.?	??.?	??.??	?.??	??.??	?:??.?	DNF	
