= 1993 Guatemalan presidential election =

- 5 June 1993
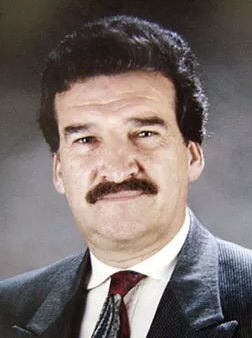
Nominee	Ramiro de León Carpio
Party	Independent
Alliance	PAN–MAS–FRG–MLN
Running mate	Arturo Herbruger
Electoral vote	106
Percentage	100%
President before election
Jorge Serrano
MAS
Acting President
Ramiro de León
Independent

Indirect presidential elections were held in Guatemala on 5 June 1993. They were sparked by the 1993 Guatemalan constitutional crisis in which President Jorge Serrano Elías had attempted a self-coup. The result was a victory for Ramiro de León Carpio, who won unopposed in the second round of voting, whilst the army-backed Arturo Herbruger was elected vice-president.

== Results ==
Candidate	Party	First round		Second round	
Candidate	Party	Votes	%	Votes	%
Ramiro de León Carpio	PAN–MAS–FRG–MLN	64	55.65	106	100.00
Arturo Herbruger	DCG–UCN	51	44.35		
Total		115	100.00	106	100.00
Valid votes		115	100.00		
Invalid/blank votes		0	0.00		
Total votes		115	100.00		
Registered voters/turnout		116	99.14		

== Bibliography ==
- Dosal, Paul J. Power in transition: the rise of Guatemala’s industrial oligarchy, 1871-1994. Westport: Praeger. 1995.
- Fischer, Edward F. Cultural logics and global economies: Maya identity in thought and practice. Austin: University of Texas Press, Austin. 2001.
- Keesing’s record of world events June 1993.
- McCleary, Rachel M. Dictating democracy: Guatemala and the end of violent revolution. Gainesville: University Press of Florida. 1999.
- Steigenga, Timothy J. The politics of the spirit: the political implications of pentecostalized religion in Costa Rica and Guatemala. Lanham, Maryland: Lexington Books. 2001.
- Villagrán Kramer, Francisco. Biografía política de Guatemala: años de guerra y años de paz. Guatemala: FLACSO. 2004.
- Warren, Kay B. Indigenous movements and their critics: Pan-Maya activism in Guatemala. Princeton: Princeton University Press. 1998.
