= 1994 Guatemalan constitutional referendum =

Constitutional referendum

- 30 January 1994

Results
| Choice | Votes | % |
|---|---|---|
| Yes | 370,044 | 83.95% |
| No | 70,761 | 16.05% |
| Valid votes | 440,805 | 80.75% |
| Invalid or blank votes | 105,089 | 19.25% |
| Total votes | 545,894 | 100.00% |
| Registered voters/turnout | 3,439,331 | 15.87% |

A constitutional referendum was held in Guatemala on 30 January 1994. It followed a constitutional crisis and an attempted self-coup on 25 May 1993 by President Jorge Serrano Elías. Among the reforms was a plan to reduce the parliamentary term of the current government. The changes were approved by 83.9% of voters, although voter turnout was just 15.9%.

== Results ==
| Choice | Votes | % |
|---|---|---|
| For | 370,044 | 83.9 |
| Against | 70,761 | 16.1 |
| Invalid/blank votes | 105,089 | – |
| Total | 545,894 | 100 |
Source: Nohlen
