= 1993 Guatemalan constitutional crisis =

Attempted self-coup in Guatemala in 1993

- Part of the Guatemalan Civil War
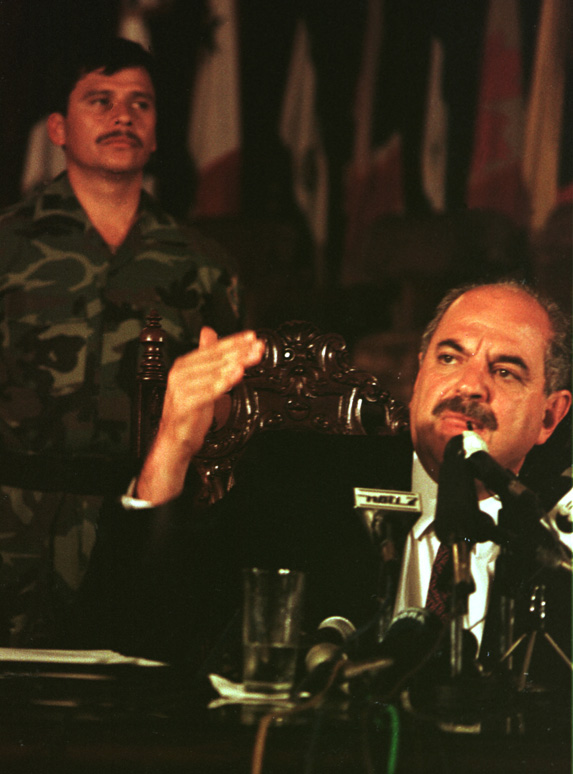
- Serrano (right) addresses a press conference after seizing power in a military-backed surprise coup de force, 25 May 1993
| Date | May 25, 1993 – June 5, 1993 |
| Location | Guatemala |
| Result | President Jorge Serrano Elías resigns; Gustavo Espina becomes interim president; Espina removed from office by the Congress of Guatemala; replaced by Ramiro de León |

Belligerents
| Executive branch; Council of Ministers; President of Guatemala | Congress; Constitutional Court; Supreme Court of Justice; Attorney General of the Nation; Chief Attorney General; Supreme Electoral Tribunal; Guatemalan populace Supported by: Organization of American States; United Nations; United States |

Commanders and leaders
| Jorge Serrano Elías; Gustavo Espina; Aída de Castillo; Roxana Baldetti; Francisco Perdomo; Arturo Alvarado Pérez | Epaminondas González; Arturo Herbruger Asturias; Ramiro de León Carpio; Jorge García Laguardia; Others: José Rubén Zamora |

The 1993 Guatemala constitutional crisis took place in 1993 when then President Jorge Serrano Elías attempted a self-coup or autogolpe. On Tuesday May 25, 1993, Serrano illegally suspended the constitution, dissolved Congress and the Supreme Court, imposed censorship, and tried to restrict civil freedom.

The attempted self-coup was similar to the one carried out by Alberto Fujimori, but unlike Fujimori's, had no popular support: Serrano's action met with strong protests by most elements of Guatemalan society, at the forefront of which was the Siglo Veintiuno newspaper under the leadership of José Rubén Zamora. This was combined with international pressure (the Organization of American States condemned the autogolpe) and the army's enforcement of the decisions of the Constitutional Court, which ruled against the attempted takeover.

In the face of this pressure, Serrano resigned as president and fled the country. He was replaced on an interim basis by his vice president, Gustavo Espina. However, Espina was judged by the Constitutional Court to have been involved in the coup as well, and Congress replaced him with Human Rights Ombudsman Ramiro de León.

== Background ==
In 1993, Guatemala was participating in a young democracy of seven years, continually weakened by frequent episodes of violence and corruption. The first mass expressions of popular discontent appeared in March as protests against increases in energy and transportation prices. The situation later escalated in the face of strong opposition from the public secondary-level student sector, which viewed a proposed student uniform as a sign of militarization, combined with an offer of free public transportation that it regarded with little credibility. By 12 May, the 17-year-old student Abner Adiel Hernández was killed during a violent protest in front of Congress, as was shown on video, by the personal security detail of a deputy.

== Self-coup ==
In the early morning hours of Tuesday May 25, 1993, President Jorge Serrano Elías suspended the Constitution, dissolved the Congress, disbanded the Supreme Court, and declared himself dictator for the next two-and-a-half years. He also suspended 59 articles of the Guatemalan Constitution. At the same time, Serrano called on the Supreme Electoral Tribunal to convoke elections for a National Constituent Assembly in 60 days.

Serrano had severely overestimated his support from the military and underestimated the international diplomatic reaction to his coup. Furthermore, his move had the unintended effect of catalyzing opposition not only to his leadership but to the whole structure of backroom military power that he had hoped would support him, bringing together an unlikely coalition of progressive business interests, human rights groups, and Maya activists that would play an important role in the 1996 Peace Accord negotiations.

In one last bid to stay in office, Serrano tried to recall the Congress which he had dissolved in May. Few responded and Serrano was forced to step down. He subsequently fled to El Salvador under military protection on June 2. Serrano's departure provoked another crisis when on June 2 another of his supporters, Vice-president Gustavo Espina Salguero, proclaimed himself President. Espina was prevented from taking office on the evening of June 2 when only 44 deputies attended Congress to approve his swearing-in. On June 4, the Court of Constitutionality ruled that Espina was not eligible for the presidency due to his support for Serrano's coup. The Court ordered the Congress to reconvene and elect a new president within 24 hours.

The independent press, initially censored, managed to clandestinely publish some copies on the afternoon of 26 May, which were later reproduced and distributed throughout the country. In the newspaper Prensa Libre, the Human Rights Ombudsman, who had escaped from the police via the roof of his house, declared:

"Perhaps I am the first Human Rights Ombudsman to work clandestinely, but I am a defender of the Constitution and of the democratic system. I cannot do otherwise than fight, together with the different social sectors, for the immediate return to constitutional order. Society has the right to resistance, to unite and to demand explanations regarding an absurd and illegal measure. President Serrano has committed crimes against the Constitution and, upon the restoration of constitutional order, the logical course is that he be brought to trial."

— Prensa Libre, 26 May 1993
