= Jorge Mario García Laguardia =

Guatemalan jurist (1931–2021)

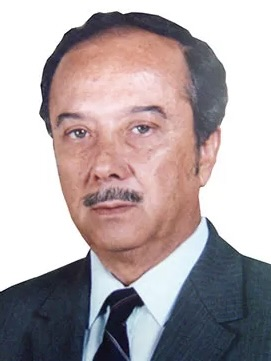

Ombudsman of Guatemala
- In office 1 July 1993 – 19 August 1997
- Preceded by: Ramiro de León Carpio
- Succeeded by: Julio Arango Escobar

Magistrate of the Constitutional Court
- In office 14 April 1991 – 1 July 1993
- Nominated by: Supreme Court of Justice
- Preceded by: Héctor Zachrissom Descamps
- Succeeded by: Edmundo Vásquez Martínez

Deputy Magistrate of the Constitutional Court
- In office 9 June 1986 – 14 April 1991
- Nominated by: Supreme Court of Justice
- Preceded by: Position established
- Succeeded by: Rodolfo Rorhmoser

Personal details
- Born: 13 July 1931; Guatemala City, Guatemala
- Died: 13 September 2021 (aged 90); Guatemala City, Guatemala
- Political party: Independent

Jorge Mario García Laguardia (13 July 1931 – 13 September 2021) was a Guatemalan jurist.

== Biography ==
He has been a tenured lecturer at several Guatemalan and foreign universities, including the Universidad de San Carlos in Guatemala City, where he founded the School of Political Science, and the National Autonomous University of Mexico, and he has served the Guatemalan state in several juridical capacities.

García Laguardia's academic work has focussed on three main areas: the history of public law, Latin American integration (particularly that of Central America), and constitutional law.

He spent a number of years in exile during Guatemala's Civil War, lecturing and conducting research at the UNAM in Mexico City.

In 1983 he became executive director of the Interamerican Center for Electoral Advice and Promotion (Centro Interamericano de Asesoría y Promoción Electoral, Capel), based in San José, Costa Rica. Between 1985 and 1989 he worked for the Costa Rica–based Inter-American Institute of Human Rights.

As the Guatemalan Civil War drew to a close, he returned to his country and was appointed a magistrate of the Constitutional Court; he was serving there during President Jorge Serrano's attempted "self-coup" of 25 May 1993, when the Court was instrumental in preserving the country's constitutional order, preventing a military takeover, and installing Ramiro de León as caretaker president. After his time with the Constitutional Court, he was appointed to serve as the country's Procurator (ombudsman) for Human Rights (Procurador de Derechos Humanos).
