= Boris Ivanov =

Boris Ivanov may refer to:

- Boris Ivanov (athlete) (born 1947), Soviet decathlete
- Boris Ivanov (actor) (1920–2002), Soviet and Russian film and theater actor

== See also ==
- Borislav Ivanov (born 1987), Bulgarian chess player
- Borislav Ivanov (karateka) (born 1977), Bulgarian karateka
