= Barry King =

Barry King may refer to:

- Barry King (decathlete) (1945–2021), British decathlete
- Barry King (tennis) (born 1985), Irish tennis player
