= Athletics at the 1970 British Commonwealth Games – Men's javelin throw =

Men's javelin throw at the 1970 British Commonwealth Games
- Venue: Meadowbank Stadium, Edinburgh
- Dates: 23 July 1970

Medalists
gold medal	Dave Travis	England
silver medal	John McSorley	England
bronze medal	John FitzSimons	England

The men's javelin throw event at the 1970 British Commonwealth Games was held on 23 July at the Meadowbank Stadium in Edinburgh, Scotland.

== Results ==
Final results
Rank	Name	Nationality	Distance	Notes
1st place, gold medalist(s)	Dave Travis	England	79.50	
2nd place, silver medalist(s)	John McSorley	England	76.74	
3rd place, bronze medalist(s)	John FitzSimons	England	73.20	
4	Sig Koscik	Australia	73.12	
5	Wilfred Mwalwanda	Malawi	71.72	
6	David Birkmyre	Scotland	70.38	
7	Kenneth Holmes	Wales	68.62	
8	William Heikkila	Canada	66.60	
9	Nigel Sherlock	Wales	66.24	
10	Allah Dad	Pakistan	62.64	
11	Roland Boulle	Mauritius	57.34	
12	James Mwita Wanda	Tanzania	57.20	
13	Barry Dodd	Zambia	48.38	
