= Wilfred Mwalawanda =

Malawian decathlete

Personal information
- Nationality: Malawian
- Born: 20 December 1944 (age 80)

Sport
- Sport: Athletics
- Event(s): Javelin throw Decathlon

Wilfred Mwalawanda (born 20 December 1944) is a Malawian athlete. He competed in the men's decathlon at the 1972 Summer Olympics, where he won the decathlon javelin throw competition.

Mwalawanda's strength was considered to be in the throwing events, and he was considered one of Malawi's strongest throwers along with Paulus Mulaudzi in the 1970s. He finished 5th in the javelin throw at the 1970 Commonwealth Games, placing as the top African athlete.

Mwalawanda trained at 7,000 feet of altitude at the Inyanga Mountains of Rhodesia to prepare for the 1972 Olympics, using an isometric machine to strain his arms. He won the Olympic decathlon javelin throw outright, but underperformed in other events. He nonetheless set several Malawian records during his Olympic decathlon performance, including in the 110 metres hurdles.

Beginning in the 1980s, Mwalawanda began to represent South Africa internationally. He continued to compete in masters athletics into the 1990s, winning the M50 javelin throw at the 1993 World Masters Athletics Championships.
