= Gustavo Adolfo Espina Salguero =

Guatemalan politician (1946–2024)

Gustavo Espina
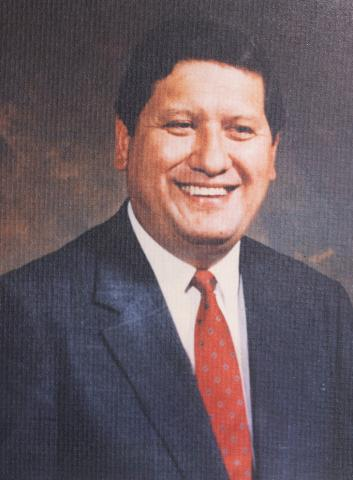
- Official portrait, 1991

42nd President of Guatemala
- In office 1 June 1993 – 5 June 1993
- Preceded by: Jorge Serrano
- Succeeded by: Ramiro de León

Vice President of Guatemala
- In office 14 January 1991 – 1 June 1993
- President: Jorge Serrano
- Preceded by: Roberto Carpio
- Succeeded by: Arturo Herbruger

Personal details
- Born: 26 November 1946 Horcones, Jutiapa, Guatemala
- Died: 23 October 2024 (aged 77)
- Party: Solidarity Action Movement

Gustavo Adolfo Espina Salguero (26 November 1946 – 23 October 2024) was a Guatemalan politician who served as vice president from 1991 to 1993 under President Jorge Serrano and later Acting President for 4 days during the 1993 Guatemalan constitutional crisis.

== Life and career ==
Espina Salguero was born in Horcones, Jutiapa, Guatemala, on 26 November 1946.

Serrano attempted a self-coup on 25 May 1993, but was forced to flee into exile on 1 June. Espina proclaimed himself interim president but was never recognized. He spent the following years in exile and, in 1997, returned voluntarily to stand trial for his involvement in the coup. He was convicted of violating the constitution, but his sentence was commuted to a small fine.

Espina Salguero died on 23 October 2024, at the age of 77.

Political offices
Preceded by Roberto Carpio	Vice President of Guatemala; 1991–1993	Succeeded by Arturo Herbruger
