= Hans-Joachim Perk =

German decathlete

Personal information
- Nationality: German
- Born: 19 September 1945 (age 79); Berlin, West Germany

Sport
- Sport: Athletics
- Event: Decathlon

Hans-Joachim Perk (born 19 September 1945) is a German athlete. He competed in the men's decathlon at the 1972 Summer Olympics, hosted in Munich, Germany.

He was educated as an electrical engineer, but after his education and athletic career, he eventually worked as the Head of the Municipal Office for Sports and Baths in Göttingen, as well as at a Sports and Leisure company in the same city.

In his later years he developed an interest in sailing, and began to sail on his 14-m yacht "Aquamarin."
