= Luis Alberto Flores Asturias =

Guatemalan athlete and politician

Luis Flores Asturias
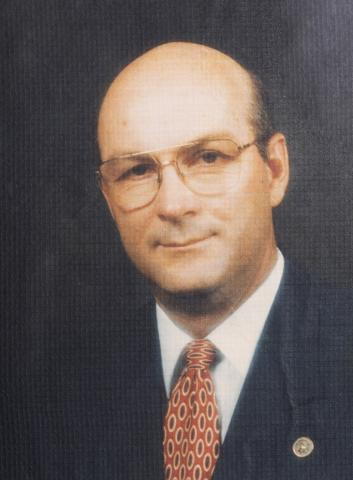
- Official portrait

Vice President of Guatemala
- In office 14 January 1996 – 14 January 2000
- President: Álvaro Arzú
- Preceded by: Arturo Herbruger
- Succeeded by: Juan Francisco Reyes

Personal details
- Born: 29 October 1947 (age 77); Guatemala City, Guatemala
- Political party: National Advancement Party

Luis Alberto Flores Asturias (born 29 October 1947) is a Guatemalan athlete and politician who served as Vice President of Guatemala from January 1996 to January 2000 in the cabinet of President Álvaro Arzú. He also competed in the men's decathlon at the 1972 Summer Olympics.

Preceded by Arturo Herbruger	Vice President of Guatemala; 1996–2000	Succeeded by Juan Francisco Reyes
