= Ruedi Mangisch =

Swiss decathlete

Personal information
- Nationality: Swiss
- Born: 6 December 1952 (age 72)

Sport
- Sport: Athletics
- Event: Decathlon

Ruedi Mangisch (born 6 December 1952) is a Swiss athlete. He competed in the men's decathlon at the 1972 Summer Olympics.
