= József Bakai =

Hungarian decathlete

Personal information
- Nationality: Hungarian
- Born: 13 March 1942 (age 84) Kéthely, Hungary

Sport
- Sport: Athletics
- Event: Decathlon
Medal record
Representing Hungary
Summer Universiade
Silver medal – second place	1965 Budapest	Decathlon

József Bakai (born 13 March 1942) is a Hungarian athlete. He competed in the men's decathlon at the 1972 Summer Olympics.
