= Clifford Brooks (athlete) =

Barbadian decathlete

Personal information
- Nationality: Barbadian
- Born: 19 August 1944 (age 80)
- Height: 181 cm (5 ft 11 in)
- Weight: 80 kg (176 lb)

Sport
- Sport: Athletics
- Event: Decathlon

Clifford Brooks (born 19 August 1944) is a Barbadian athlete. He competed in the men's decathlon at the 1972 Summer Olympics.

On two occasions Brooks finished third in the decathlon event at the British 1971 AAA Championships and 1974 AAA Championships.
