= Ramiro de León Carpio =

Guatemalan politician, President (1993–96)

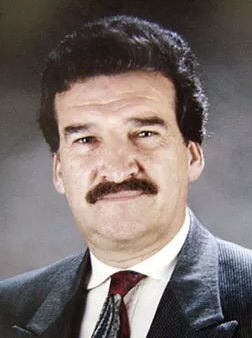
- Official portrait as Attorney for Human Rights

43rd President of Guatemala
- In office 6 June 1993 – 14 January 1996
- Vice President: Arturo Herbruger Asturias
- Preceded by: Gustavo Espina
- Succeeded by: Álvaro Arzú

Ombudsman of Guatemala
- In office 13 August 1987 – 6 June 1993
- Preceded by: Gonzalo Menéndez de la Riva
- Succeeded by: Jorge Mario García Laguardia

Personal details
- Born: 12 January 1942 Guatemala City, Guatemala
- Died: 16 April 2002 (aged 60) Miami, United States
- Party: Independent (until 1999, since 2002)
- Other party: Guatemalan Republican Front (1999 – 2002)
- Spouse(s): Mayra Duque, Maria Eugenia Morales
- Children: 3

Ramiro de León Carpio (12 January 1942 – 16 April 2002) was a Guatemalan politician who served as the 43rd president of Guatemala from June 1993 until January 1996. He served as Guatemala's Attorney for Human Rights from August 1987 to June 1993.

== Career ==
De León studied law at the University of San Carlos and then at the Rafael Landívar University, where he ran the Sol Bolivariano ("Bolivarian Sun") newspaper. After graduating, he became a state civil servant, working in the Common Market division of the Ministry of Economy between 1967 and 1969, when he became the permanent secretary of the tariff committee. In 1970, he became permanent secretary for the National Committee for Economic and Political Integration. During this time, he joined the right-wing National Liberation Movement (MLN), whose candidate, Carlos Arana, won the 1970 presidential elections. During Arana's four-year term, de León served as secretary general of the State Advisory Board. He then moved to the private sector, joining the Guatemala Association of Sugar Producers, serving as their legal advisor between 1978 and 1981, and then as their general administrator until 1983. He then became involved in the bloodless coup that saw President Efraín Ríos Montt replaced by Óscar Humberto Mejía.

Along with his cousin Jorge Carpio Nicolle, he co-founded the center-right Unity of the National Center (UCN) party. It opposed authoritarianism and instead proposed social liberalism. He became one of the party's 21 deputies in 1984. He played an important role in developing the 1985 Constitution, which is still in force today. He supported his cousin in the latter's attempt to win the 1985 presidential election. Carpio got to the second round but was then defeated by Vinicio Cerezo. De León then resigned from the UCN.

In 1989, de Leon became Defensor del Pueblo ("People's Defender"), Guatemala's human rights ombudsman. While this allowed him to denounce human rights abuses by the powers that be (and be heard when he did it), he did not have any actual power to combat these abuses.

== Presidency (1993–1996) ==
On 25 May 1993, President Jorge Serrano led an autocoup – a coup d'état by someone(s) in the country's government – dissolving the constitution and the National Congress with the apparent support of the army. He further ordered the arrest of de León. He avoided arrest by escaping over the roofs of the adjacent houses and was then able to send out a condemnation of the coup. Amid protests and suspension of foreign aid, on 1 June, Serrano was forced to flee the country. The army wanted to install the conservative Gustavo Espina, vice president under Serrano, as the new President. De León had already accused him of violating the constitution during the autocoup. On 5 June, Espina resigned, and after an overwhelming vote of confidence from the reconvened National Congress, de León was quickly sworn in as President until 14 January 1996, the day Serrano was due to finish his term.

De León promised to defend public freedoms and the rule of law, make progress in the negotiations with the guerrillas, and purge the armed forces of their bad apples. He fired the defence minister General José Domingo García Samayoa, replacing him with General Jorge Roberto Perussina Rivera, who had been implicated in the massacres of the 1980s. On 3 July, his cousin Jorge Carpio, who was playing a vital role in the peace negotiations, was assassinated by right-wingers. On 26 August, he demanded that all the deputies in the National Congress and all the members of the Supreme Court of Justice resign. This created a crisis that was not resolved until 16 November, resulting in 43 amendments to the 1985 constitution, which were approved in a referendum on 30 January 1994. On 6 January, negotiations began with the leading guerrilla group, the URNG, but this time under the auspices of both the United Nations and the Organization of American States (OAS), and with a reduced role of the Guatemalan military in comparison with the previous negotiations. On 29 March, he signed the Global Accord on Human Rights, which, amongst other things, demanded the disbandment of the Autodefence Civil Patrols (PAC), which had been accused of involvement in the massacres occurring during the Civil War.

Both the murder of Supreme Court chief Eduardo Epaminondas González Dubón on 3 April and a massacre of civilians by soldiers in Xamán, department of Alta Verapaz, on 5 October 1995, created high levels of tension in the country and put strains on the peace process. Yet, despite these tensions, free elections were able to be held under de León's tenure. On 14 August 1994, 80 of the 116 seats in the National Congress came up for election, which was Guatemala, where the members of Congress normally stand for election to coincide with the presidential election. On 12 November 1995, a new presidential election was held, and in the second round on 7 January 1996, Álvaro Arzú won to succeed de León.

== Post-presidency ==
In October 1996, de Leon became a deputy in the Central American Parliament. During the next few years, he worked as an international advisor and was an election monitor for the OAS. In 1999, he joined the Guatemalan Republican Front (FRG) and was elected to the Congress in the November elections. Then, on 11 March 2002, he resigned his seat in the Congress and from the FRG, declaring that he wished he had never accepted their leader Efraín Ríos Montt's invitation to join the party. He intended to write his memoirs and reinvolve himself in international work. However, he died while visiting Miami, United States, on 16 April, probably from a diabetic coma. National mourning was declared, and he was given a state funeral. He was posthumously awarded the Grand Collar of the Sovereign National Congress.

Political offices
Preceded by Gustavo Espina	31st President of Guatemala; 1993–1996	Succeeded by Álvaro Arzú
