= Roberto Carpio =

Guatemalan politician (1930–2022)

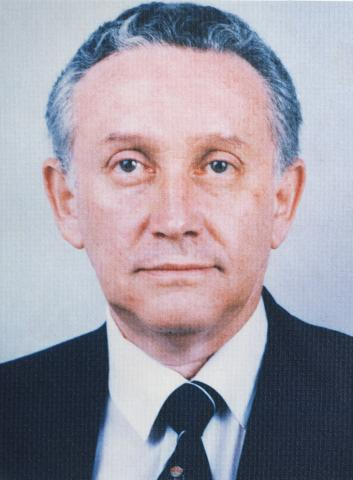
- Official portrait

Vice President of Guatemala
- In office 14 January 1986 – 14 January 1991
- President: Vinicio Cerezo
- Preceded by: Óscar Mendoza Azurdia
- Succeeded by: Gustavo Espina

Personal details
- Born: 16 July 1930; Guatemala City, Guatemala
- Died: 24 February 2022 (aged 91); Guatemala City, Guatemala
- Political party: Guatemalan Christian Democracy
- Relatives: Jorge Carpio Nicolle (brother)
- Website: robertocarpionicolle.org.gt

Roberto Carpio Nicolle (16 July 1930 – 24 February 2022) was a Guatemalan politician who served as Vice President of Guatemala from 14 January 1986 to 14 January 1991 in the cabinet of President Vinicio Cerezo. He was a member of DCG.

Before he was elected as Vice President, Carpio served as the President of the National Constituent Assembly from 1984 to January 1986.

Carpio died in Guatemala City on 24 February 2022 at the age of 91.

Preceded by Vacant	Vice President of Guatemala; 1986–1991	Succeeded by Gustavo Espina
