= Stefan Schreyer =

German decathlete

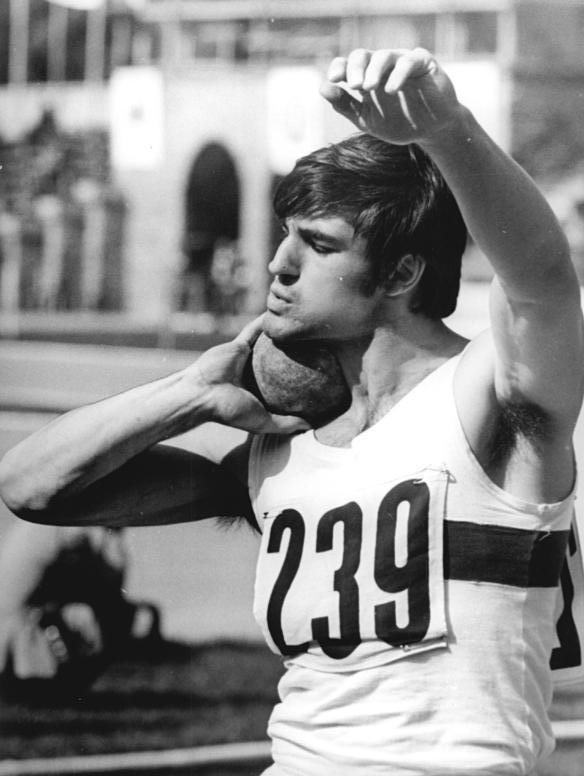
- Stefan Schreyer in 1972

Personal information
- Born: 23 October 1946 (age 78); Gotha, Soviet occupation zone

Sport
- Sport: Athletics
- Event: Decathlon

Stefan Schreyer (born 23 October 1946) is a German athlete. He competed in the men's decathlon at the 1972 Summer Olympics.
