= Jeff Bannister =

American decathlete (born 1945)

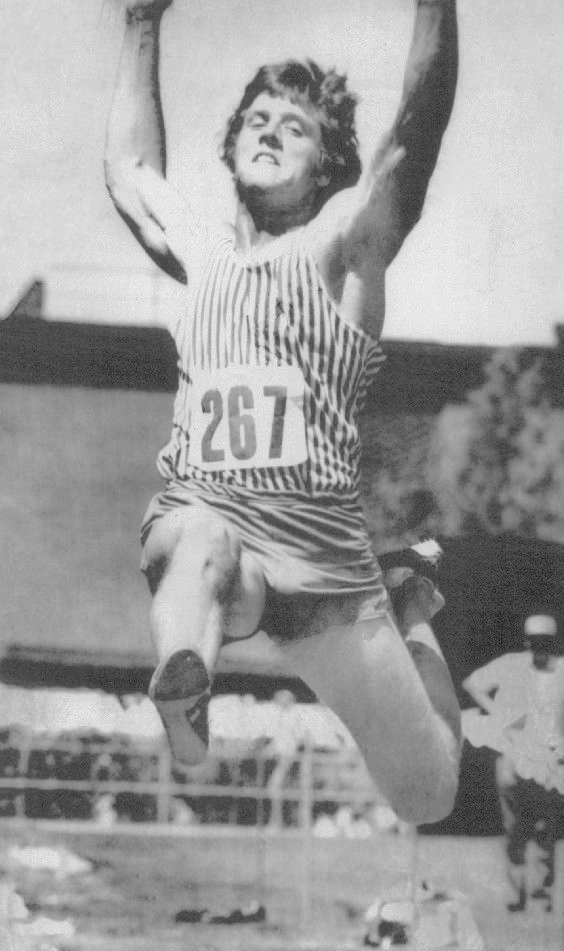
- Bannister at the 1972 Olympic Trials

Personal information
- Born: August 30, 1945 (age 80) Providence, Rhode Island, U.S.
- Height: 191 cm (6 ft 3 in)
- Weight: 93 kg (205 lb)

Sport
- Sport: Athletics
- Event: Decathlon
- Club: University of New Hampshire; Decathlon Club of America

Achievements and titles
- Personal best(s): 100 m – 10.4 (1970); 400 m – 46.8 (1972); 1500 m – 4:10.4 (1972); 110 mH – 14.4 (1970); HJ – 1.98 m (1972); LJ – 7.35 m (1972)

Jeffrey Granville Bannister (born August 30, 1945) is a retired American decathlete. In 1972, he won the U.S. Olympic Trials and placed 21st at the 1972 Summer Olympics.

Bannister played basketball as a forward at University of New Hampshire. In 1966, he won the AAU pentathlon title; in the decathlon he finished third in 1969 and second in 1972.
