= Jeff Bennett (decathlete) =

American decathlete (born 1948)

Personal information
- Nationality: American
- Citizenship: USA
- Born: August 29, 1948 (age 77) Vinita, Oklahoma
- Occupation: Coach

Sport
- Sport: Track and field

Achievements and titles
- Olympic finals: 4th place in decathlon in 1972 Summer Olympics

Jefferson Taft "Jeff" Bennett (born August 29, 1948) is an American former decathlete who competed in the 1972 Summer Olympics.

== Athletics in high school and college ==
Bennett is a native of Vinita, Oklahoma. (Note: As of April 2019, Sports Reference now gives Bennett's full name as Jefferson Taft "Jeff" Bennett and says he was born in Taft, Oklahoma.) He has said that he was inspired into entering track and field competition by watching Olympian athletes performing in the 1960 Olympic games pole vault event. In high school he also became interested in long jumping and running hurdles. but the pole vault was still his favorite event. He won the state title when he was a senior, after coming in second in his sophomore and junior years. After high school, he went on to Oklahoma Christian University (OC). (Note: OC was then known as Oklahoma Christian College.) When he was a sophomore at OC, he ran the 400-meter hurdles and won the national meet. He also began training to compete in the decathlon. Bennett still holds the OCW records in the 400-meter hurdles and decathlon. Before his graduation in 1970, he was named a four-time National Association of Intercollegiate Athletics All-American and a member of the NAIA and Oklahoma Christian University Athletics Halls of Fame.

== Military service ==
After graduating from OC, Bennett accepted a teaching position in Midwest City, though he said he still wanted to compete in decathlons. Instead he received the notice stating he had been drafted into the U.S. Army. Most draftees at that time could expect to be sent to Vietnam for combat duty. Bennett knew that the army had its own track team and was looking for exceptional athletes to represent their service. Bennett jumped at the chance to join the team, since the assignment took him off the list for Vietnam. He worked full-time at athletics, then spent the rest of his duty time as a headquarters filing clerk.

== 1972 Olympics ==
His assignment also enabled him to participate in the qualifying trials for the 1972 Olympics. He was able to be on the Munich-bound team. Tragically, a team of heavily armed terrorists succeeded in invading the venue, where they captured many of the Israeli competitors and their coaches on the day before the decathlon was to start. Bennett later recalled that there was much uncertainty about whether the games would be cancelled altogether. (Note: Bennett was the smallest competitor in the decathlon event, 5 feet, 8 inches and 152 pounds, but he finished third in the 100-meter run, second in the 400-meter run and won the pole vault, which offset his lower marks in shot put and discus. He finished second in the 1,500-meter run, which pushed him to fourth place in the overall decathlon, just ten points below the cutoff for a bronze medal.)

== Later life ==
Bennett continued to compete after the 1972 Olympics. In the following year, he won the Amateur Athletic Union national decathlon championship. He had wanted to compete in the 1976 Olympics, but injuries prevented him from doing so. After that, he retired from the sport. He spent thirty years in the National Guard, while teaching and coaching in the Oklahoma City school system. Then, he retired from working in the public schools, and went to work for his alma mater, Oklahoma Christian University.
