= Hans-Joachim Walde =

German athlete (1942–2013)

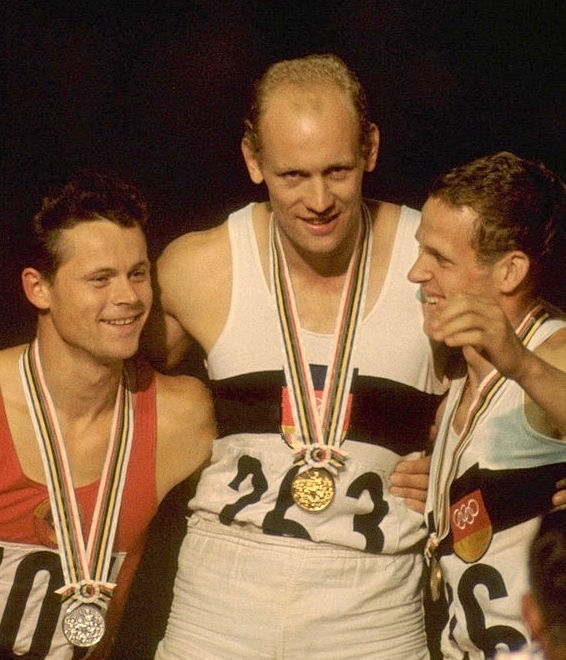
- Walde (right) at the 1964 Olympics

Personal information
- Born: 28 June 1942 Ober Gläsersdorf, Germany
- Died: 18 April 2013 (aged 70) Jever, Germany

Sport
- Sport: Athletics
- Event: Decathlon
- Club: Universitätssportclub Mainz
- Coached by: Friedel Schirmer

Achievements and titles
- Personal best: 8094 (1968)
Medal record
Men's athletics
Representing Germany
Olympic Games
Bronze medal – third place	1964 Tokyo	Decathlon
Representing West Germany
Olympic Games
Silver medal – second place	1968 Mexico City	Decathlon
European Championships
Bronze medal – third place	1971 Helsinki	Decathlon
Universiade
Gold medal – first place	1967 Tokyo	Decathlon

Hans-Joachim Walde (28 June 1942 – 18 April 2013) was a West German track and field athlete. He competed in the decathlon at the 1964, 1968 and 1972 Olympics and won a bronze medal in 1964 and a silver in 1968.

Walde won national decathlon titles in 1964 and 1969, and set a world record the heptathlon in 1970. For several years he was the athlete's speaker of the German National Team. After retiring from competitions Walde became an orthopedic surgeon. He first specialized in general traumas, but then switched to sports medicine, in particular to shoulder surgery. He was a member of the German Shoulder and Elbow Society (DVSW) and director of sports medicine at Northwest Hospital in Frisian Sanderbusch, Lower Saxony. His son Hendrik also competed in decathlon.
