= Radu Gavrilaș =

Romanian decathlete

Personal information
- Nationality: Romanian
- Born: 5 April 1952 (age 74)

Sport
- Sport: Athletics
- Event: Decathlon

Radu Gavrilaș (born 5 April 1952) is a Romanian athlete. He competed in the men's decathlon at the 1972 Summer Olympics.
