= Heinz Born =

Swiss athlete

Personal information
- Nationality: Swiss
- Born: 5 April 1952 (age 72)

Sport
- Sport: Athletics
- Event: Decathlon

Heinz Born (born 5 April 1952) is a Swiss athlete. He competed in the men's decathlon at the 1972 Summer Olympics.
