= Eltjo Schutter =

Dutch decathlete

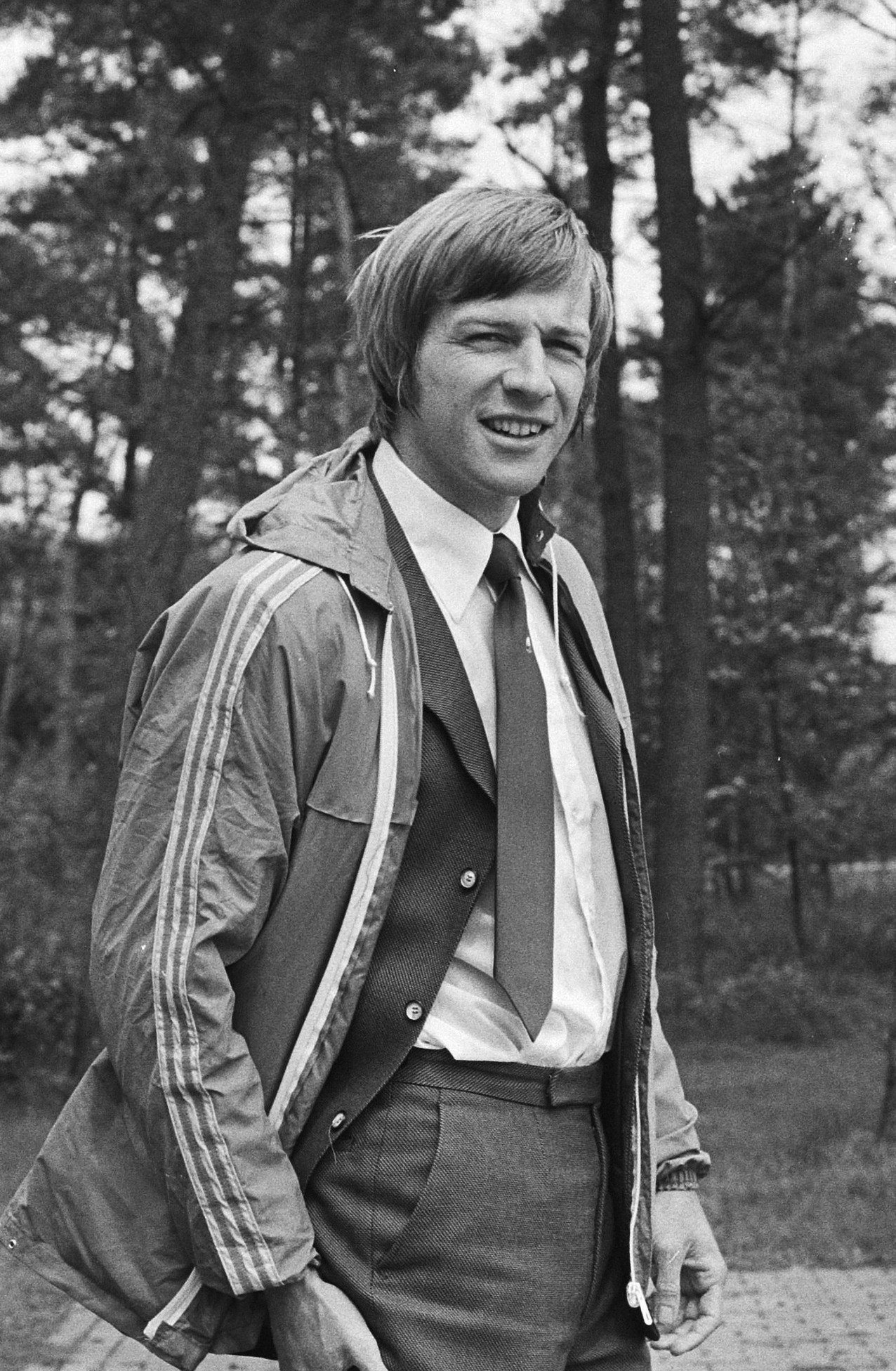
- Eltjo Schutter in 1977

Personal information
- Born: 17 June 1953 (age 73) Driehuis, the Netherlands
- Height: 1.91 m (6 ft 3 in)
- Weight: 78 kg (172 lb)

Sport
- Sport: Decathlon
- Club: Quick, Nijmegen

Eltjo Marinus Jan Schutter (born 17 June 1953) is a retired Dutch decathlete. He competed at the 1976 Summer Olympics, but failed in the 400 metres.

Schutter virtually retired from competitions in 1979 to study gynecology and obstetrics and graduated in 1984, becoming one of the youngest gynecologists in the Netherlands. From 1984 to 1990 he lived in Mönchengladbach in connection with his medical work. After returning to the Netherlands he was employed at the VU University Medical Center and then at the Medisch Spectrum Twente. He also occasionally worked as a radio commentator of athletics events.
