= Gerry Moro =

Canadian decathlete

Personal information
- Full name: Guerrino "Gerry" Moro
- Nationality: Canadian
- Born: 17 April 1943 (age 83)

Sport
- Sport: Athletics
- Event: Decathlon

Guerrino "Gerry" Moro (born 17 April 1943) is a Canadian athlete. He competed in the decathlon at the 1964 Summer Olympics and the 1972 Summer Olympics.

Moro competed for the Oregon Ducks track and field team in the NCAA.

In 1966, he competed in the men's decathlon at the 1966 British Empire and Commonwealth Games held in Kingston, Jamaica.
