= Lennart Hedmark =

Swedish athletics competitor

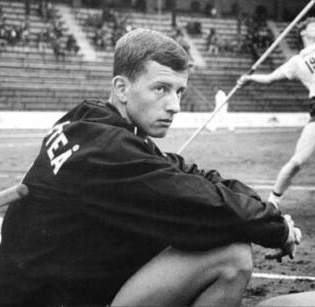
- Hedmark in 1964

Personal information
- Born: 18 May 1944 (age 82) Skellefteå, Sweden
- Height: 195 cm (6 ft 5 in)
- Weight: 90 kg (198 lb)

Sport
- Sport: Athletics
- Event: Decathlon
- Club: Skellefteå AIK
Medal record
Men's athletics
Representing Sweden
European Championships
Silver medal – second place	1971 Helsinki	Decathlon
Universiade
Silver medal – second place	1970 Turin	Decathlon
Bronze medal – third place	1965 Budapest	Javelin throw

Lennart Per-Olav Hedmark (born 18 May 1944) is a retired Swedish track and field athlete who competed in the decathlon. He represented his country at the 1968, 1972 and 1976 Summer Olympics with the best result of eighth place in 1976.

He started his career as a javelin throw specialist and claimed three straight titles in the event at the Swedish Championships from 1963 to 1965. He was selected to compete at the 1964 Summer Olympics, but did not start the competition. His first international medal came at the 1965 Summer Universiade, where he was the bronze medallist.

Hedmark was an All-American javelin thrower for the Penn State Nittany Lions track and field team, finishing runner-up in that event at the 1965 NCAA University Division outdoor track and field championships.

Hedmark changed his focus to combined events in 1967 and he was one of his region's dominant athletes over his career: he had four consecutive victories in the Nordic Combined Events Championships from 1967 to 1970, and in a decade of national competition he won seven Swedish decathlon titles in addition to five titles in the pentathlon. At the 1968 Summer Olympics he came eleventh in the decathlon. International medals came at the 1970 Summer Universiade, where he took the silver behind Mykola Avilov, and at the 1971 European Athletics Championships, finishing as runner-up to the defending champion Joachim Kirst.

He made his second Olympic appearance at the 1972 Munich Games, but he did not manage to finish the competition. The following year he was the inaugural winner of the European Combined Events Cup. His best performance of the year came in Bonn and his total of 8163 points was the best by any athlete that year. Hedmark's final major appearance came at the 1976 Summer Olympics and had his best Olympic outing with a score of 8002 for eighth place.

Although he never won a major title, Hedmark's career was one of the most prolific as he competed in a total of 76 combined events competitions. This was the greatest number ever for a top level athlete at the time and remains among the highest totals; Kip Janvrin bettered this achievement and was himself succeeded by Roman Šebrle, who completed over 100 appearances. Hedmark is now the fourth most prolific combined eventer after Janvrin, Šebrle and Tomáš Dvořák.

He married Briton Linda Knowles, a fellow top class European athlete.

== See also ==
- List of Pennsylvania State University Olympians
