= Arturo Herbruger =

Guatemalan politician

Arturo Herbruger Asturias
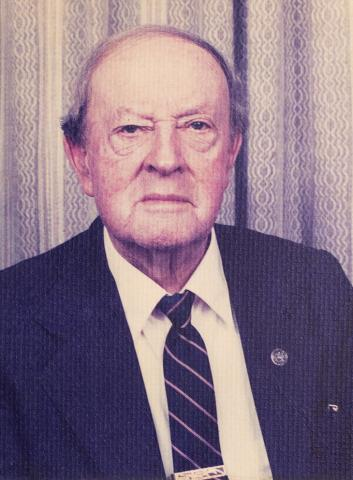
- Official portrait

Vice President of Guatemala
- In office June 18, 1993 – January 14, 1996
- President: Ramiro de Leon Carpio
- Preceded by: Gustavo Adolfo Espina Salguero
- Succeeded by: Luis Alberto Flores Asturias

Chief Justice of the Supreme Electoral Tribunal of Guatemala
- In office August 8, 1983 – June 18, 1993
- President: Jorge Serrano Elías

Personal details
- Born: June 3, 1912 Guatemala City
- Died: 25 October 1999 (aged 87) Guatemala City

Arturo Herbruger Asturias (3 June 1912 – 25 October 1999) was a Guatemalan politician who served as Vice President of Guatemala from 18 June 1993 to 14 January 1996 in the cabinet of President Ramiro de León. He was elected by National Congress. He was previously head of the Supreme Electoral Tribunal from 1983 to 1993. Herbruger was also Attorney General and president of the Supreme Court. He was the Minister of Finance responsible for the treasury in 1948.

Preceded by Gustavo Adolfo Espina Salguero	Vice President of Guatemala; 1993–1996	Succeeded by Luis Alberto Flores
