= Yves Le Roy =

French decathlete

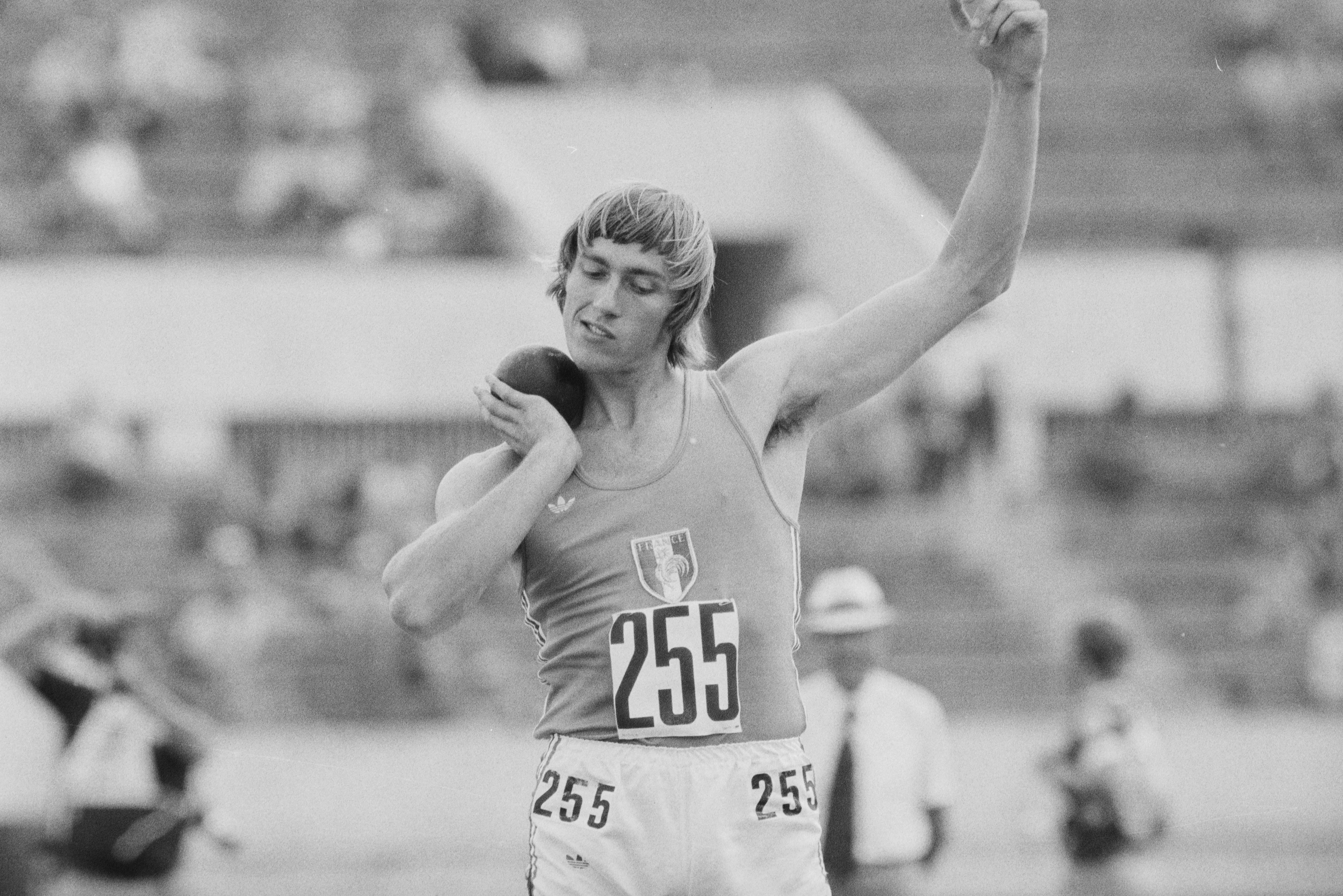
- Le Roy in 1974

Personal information
- Nationality: French
- Born: 23 February 1951 (age 75) Paris, France

Sport
- Sport: Athletics
- Event: Decathlon
Medal record
Men's athletics
Representing France
European Championships
Silver medal – second place	1974 Rome	Decathlon

Yves Le Roy (born 23 February 1951) is a French athlete. He competed in the men's decathlon at the 1972 Summer Olympics.
