= Vijay Singh Chauhan =

Indian decathlete

Personal information
- Native name: Vijay
- Nationality: Indian
- Born: 21 January 1949 (age 77) Jaitpura Kalan, Uttar Pradesh, India
- Height: 6 ft 0 in (1.83 m)

Sport
- Country: India
- Sport: Track and field athletics
- Event: Decathlon
- Retired: Director Sports Govt of Uttar Pradesh

Achievements and titles
- Olympic finals: Munich Olympics Germany
Medal record
Men's athletics
Representing India
Asian Games
Gold medal – first place	1974 Tehran	Decathlon
Asian Championships
Gold medal – first place	1973 Manila	Decathlon
- Updated on 5 July 2013

Vijay Singh Chauhan (born 21 January 1949) is a former Indian athlete who won gold medal in decathlon in 1974 Asian Games. He participated in 1972 Olympics. He was born in 1949 in AgraUttar Pradesh state. He was honoured with Arjuna award.
