= Eduardo Epaminondas González Dubón =

Eduardo Epaminondas González Dubón was a president of the Constitutional Court of Guatemala who was assassinated in 1994.

== Murder ==
González received death threats a week before being shot and killed in his car in front of his family.

The assassination may have been political in nature. As a member of the court, González had ruled a year earlier that President Jorge Serrano's self-imposed coup was unconstitutional. He had voted to allow the United States to extradite Lieutenant Colonel Carlos Ochoa Ruiz a month before his murder. After the murder, the remaining Constitutional Court judges voted against the decision.

Marlon Salazar López and Antonio Trabanino Vargas have both been convicted of the murder of González. A third alleged murderer, Mario Salazar López, was convicted, successfully appealed the case and was arrested again in 2001.
