= Tadeusz Janczenko =

Polish decathlete

Personal information
- Nationality: Polish
- Born: 9 January 1946 (age 79); Świebodzin, Poland

Sport
- Sport: Athletics
- Event: Decathlon

Tadeusz Janczenko (born 9 January 1946) is a Polish athlete. He competed in the men's decathlon at the 1972 Summer Olympics.
