= Steen Smidt-Jensen =

Danish decathlete

Personal information
- Nationality: Danish
- Born: 26 January 1945 (age 80); Copenhagen, Denmark
- Height: 185 cm (6 ft 1 in)
- Weight: 85 kg (187 lb)

Sport
- Sport: Athletics
- Event: Decathlon/pole vault
- Club: Ben Hur, Copenhagen

Steen Smidt-Jensen (born 26 January 1945) is a Danish athlete. He competed in the men's decathlon at the 1968 Summer Olympics and the 1972 Summer Olympics.

Smidt-Jensen finished second behind Mike Bull in the pole vault event at the British 1967 AAA Championships.
