= Joachim Kirst =

East German decathlete (born 1947)

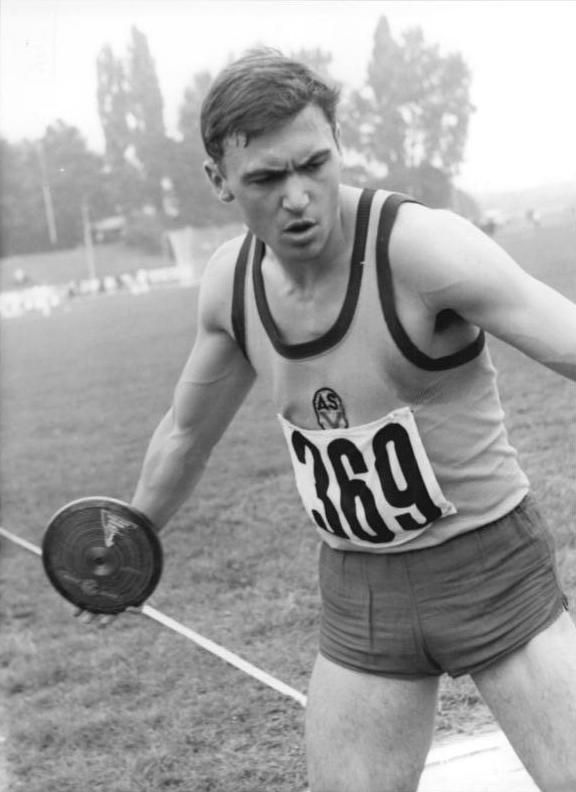
- Joachim Kirst in 1972

Medal record

Men's athletics

Representing East Germany

European Championships
Gold medal – first place	1969 Athens	Decathlon
Gold medal – first place	1971 Helsinki	Decathlon

Joachim Kirst (born 21 May 1947 in Neustadt/Harz) is a retired East German decathlete. Kirst finished fifth at the 1968 Summer Olympics in Mexico City, but did not finish the event during the 1972 Summer Olympics in Munich. He won the decathlon at the 1971 European Athletics Championships in Helsinki.

After Kirst's career, he took up coaching and sports teaching in Germany. He competed for the sports club ASK Potsdam during his active career.

== Achievements ==
Year	Tournament	Venue	Result	Extra
1966	European Junior Championships	Odessa, Soviet Union	3rd	
1968	Olympic Games	Mexico City, Mexico	5th	
1969	European Championships	Athens, Greece	1st	
1971	European Championships	Helsinki, Finland	1st	
