= Peter Gabbett =

British athlete

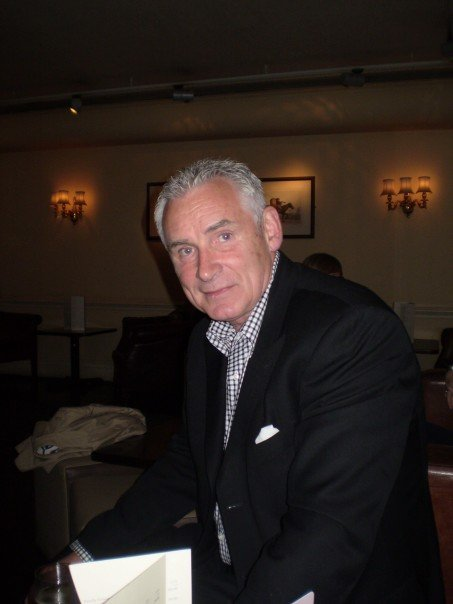
- Gabbett in 2007

Personal information
- Nationality: British (English)
- Born: 19 November 1941 (age 84) Watlington, England
- Height: 183 cm (6 ft 0 in)
- Weight: 83 kg (183 lb)

Sport
- Sport: Athletics
- Event: decathlon
- Club: Royal Navy AC; Hillingdon AC
Medal record
Commonwealth Games
Representing England
Silver medal – second place	1970 Edinburgh	Decathlon

Peter John Gabbett (born 19 November 1941) is a former holder of the British record for the decathlon. He is widely regarded as the first British decathlete to achieve world class performances in this event. He won the AAA Championships on three occasions, finished second in the 1970 Commonwealth Games, was sixth in the European Championships, and twice competed in the Olympic Games.

He improved the British Decathlon record four times, two of these were also Commonwealth Records, bringing it close to the 8,000 points mark. At an unofficial meeting at Alan Hancock College, Santa Maria, California in May 1972 he became the first British decathlete to score over 8,000 points in a decathlon though the circumstances of this performance invalidated it for record purposes. He was a Naval Air Mechanic in the Royal Navy, and married to Angela D Gabbett. During his athletic career he made his home in Portsmouth, England. On retiring from the Fleet Air Arm he established a career in shipping and forwarding and now has an Independent Financial Advisory consultancy and resides in Buckinghamshire.

== Early years ==
Gabbett was born in Watlington, Oxfordshire. He was educated at the Royal Alexandra and Albert School, in Surrey, a residential school with a reputation for sporting endeavour, graduating in 1957. In October 2005 Gabbett was guest of honour and principal speaker at a ceremony at the school to celebrate its conversion to a specialist Sports College.

Gabbett joined the Royal Navy as a Naval Air Mechanic and although sport would have formed a significant part of his training there is no record of any athletic performance until May 1960 when he finished third in a high jump competition in Portsmouth, he has since said that Athletics was his main focus and passion. By 1963 he had added sprinting to his repertoire and finished second in the Royal Navy Championship at both 100m and 200m events. Less than a month later he went one better in winning both events at the Inter Services Championships, running 10.9s for the 100m into a headwind of −0.75 m/s.

The following year (1964) he confined himself to a limited program due to competing in the Field Gun competition at the Royal Tournament, but in 1966 he started to explore his potential as a multi-event athlete by taking medals in three events at the Royal Navy Championships in Plymouth. He was at this time just "one of many" 9.9s sprinters (for 100 yards) when he decided to switch to the decathlon, which Mel Watman described as a "shrewd move". His first recorded decathlon was at the 1966 AAA Championships at Welwyn Garden City on July 1966, where he finished 5th (11.0 6.71 10.61 1.78 49.2 16.3 30.96 2.90 46.33 4:33.7) scoring 6,435 points placing him 7th in the British rankings for the year. This brought him to the attention of Tom McNab, who was at that time one of Britain's most respected and senior athletics coaches.

== International career ==
In a 1971 interview with Dave Cocksedge, asked when he first got hooked on the decathlon, Gabbet said, "It was training under Tom McNab and getting inspired by him that helped the most. I began to see the possibilities for myself; realised I had a good top class decathlon in me if I worked hard enough for it." Four decathlons in 1967 confirmed Gabbett's work ethic and enthusiasm. In May he competed twice in two weeks showing some improvement in the technical events if not the total score. In July he won the 1967 AAA Championships at Hurlingham (11.1 6.63 11.75 1.80 50.2 16.3 36.64 3.00 44.92 4:40.4) with a new personal best score of 6,533 points, and in September he went to Liège in Belgium for his first international meet where he further improved his best in finishing fourth (11.0 7.10 9.27 1.83 49.7 16.2 34.14 3.00 48.62 4:36.2) with 6,562 points.

1968 was an Olympic year, so the target for Gabbett and McNab as they head into winter training is the Olympic qualifying mark of 7,200 points, the race for which turned into something of an adventure. Indoor marks of 7.1s for 60 metres and 8.6s for 60-metre hurdles are hardly sparkling by the standard of specialist sprinters, but were a new direction for UK decathletes. The outdoor season kicked off with an encouraging 7.20m long jump at Oxford in March, after which Gabbett suffered a stress-fracture in his foot. Then in July he went to Crystal Palace for his first decathlon of the season. A 10.8s 100m and a fine 7.35m long jump set up the first day nicely, and after a "fiery" 48.7s 400m in which he "demolished" 400-metre specialist John Hemery, Gabbett ended day one on 3,901 points, easily the best by a British athlete. Below par for the first two events on the next day, both Jim Smith and Dave Travis the javelin specialist closed in on Gabbett, but a determined personal best 3.40m in the pole vault put him not just back in the lead but back on schedule. A "pathetic" javelin throw of 42.91m ended hopes of achieving the Olympic qualifying mark, but all three leaders had hopes of achieving 7,000 points as they lined up for the final event. Travis tried gallantly but could not stay with the nimbler athlete and Gabbett's 5.7s lead at the tape was sufficient for his first National Record (10.8 7.35 11.78 1.83 48.7 15.7 35.91 3.40 42.91 4:25.2) of 7,082 points. Travis also passed 7,000 points and third placed Jim Smith was only 22 points shy of the mark. With two decathletes over 7,000 points, respected athletics journalist Mel Watman said that British decathlon had, "come of age".

But 7,082 is not 7,200 and Mexico was still a long way off. The second-highest ranked decathlete in the world at that time was the American Bill Toomey, who was in London the following month (he married British Olympic athlete Mary Rand in 1969) and was persuaded to enter the AAA Decathlon Championship as a guest. Toomey, who had previously run 10.3s, was expected to leave Gabbett in arrears in the first event, particularly after the American got a "flying start", but Gabbett made up the handicap to share a time of 10.8s, (equalling his best). He came close to his best in the long jump, "slumped" in the shot (his weakest event), equalled his best (1.83m) in the high jump and in the chilly and damp evening of day one he held Toomey – whose best was 2 seconds better than Gabbett's – to half a yard in the 400m to record a personal best 48.5s. The first day brought 3,872 points (compared to 3,901 in his 7,082). Day two was warm and sunny and Gabbett kicked off with a best hurdles of 15.6s, "disappointed" in the discus but set a new personal best in the pole vault, "whipped out" another personal best in the javelin leaving him a target of 4:26.8 or better in the 1500 metres. Trevor Newey repeated his pacemaking from the previous month leading them through 400m in 69.6s with Gabbett on his shoulder. The 800m was passed in 2:21.4 and Gabbett took the lead at the bell. They passed 1200m in 3:33.6 and with just 200 metres to go Toomey "flashed" by in an attempt to make the 4:19.1 he needed for 8,000 points. Gabbett was not content to concede the lead and struck back in the home straight to win in a new personal best 4:20.2 having run the last lap in 64s. Toomey placed first with 7,985 points. As he was only a guest he could not be crowned the champion so Gabbett retained his AAA title, set a new AAA national record and got his Olympic qualifying mark (10.8 7.35 11.78 1.83 48.7 15.7 35.91 3.40 42.91 4:25.2) with 7,247 points. Clive Longe was selected along with Gabbett for the decathlon at the Mexico Olympics, but they didn't fly out together. James Coote said that for Gabbett, "...this was a disastrous Olympics. First he missed the plane which should have taken him out to Mexico, and then, when long jumping out on the village training track, he managed to pull a hamstring muscle. It improved to the extent that he actually entered but the muscle went again just before the start and he was forced to withdraw, leaving Longe to suffer on his own."

== International Athletes Club ==
In 1958, some of the athletes who were of a standard to be selected for international competition formed the International Athletes Club (IAC), not as a competitive outlet but to give those athletes a voice at the various administrative bodies that made decisions affecting their athletic careers. By the 1970s one of the issues that concerned them was the selection of the team manager for international events. There was a feeling among the athletes that managers performed their duties more in the manner of a teacher shepherding a flock of naughty schoolchildren rather than as the manager of a team of international athletes. Gabbett was among those elected by the athletes to represent them on these matters.

Gabbett's sporting success does not end at athletics. He has continued with sport all his life including competing in the bobsleigh with the Great Britain bobsleigh team. He is a coach not just of athletics but also of swimming and basketball and has been involved with several schools and independent teams including both his children's schools and clubs up to a National level.

== Legacy ==
Although more than thirty years have elapsed since Gabbett last completed a decathlon, he is still ranked as the sixth best British decathlete, behind Daley Thompson, Dean Macey, Alex Kruger, Simon Shirley and David Bigham. His time for the 400m in a decathlon is still the fastest ever run at sea level.

Gabbett's athletic form can be seen in sequences of the BBC Two documentary The Ascent of Man from 1973, narrated by Jacob Bronowski. He was filmed in slow motion running a sprint, pole vaulting and throwing a javelin.

== Notes ==
Citations to Athletics Weekly are in the following format: (AW volume. issue. page) where 1972 is volume 26, and each weekly issue is numbered from week 1.
