= Sepp Zeilbauer =

Austrian decathlete

Personal information
- Born: 24 September 1952 (age 73) Mürzzuschlag, Austria

Sport
- Sport: Decathlon
Medal record
Representing Austria
Summer Universiade
Gold medal – first place	1975 Rome	Decathlon
Gold medal – first place	1977 Sofia	Decathlon
Gold medal – first place	1979 Mexico City	Decathlon

Josef "Sepp" Zeilbauer (born 24 September 1952) is an Austrian retired decathlete. His personal best in the event was 8,310 points, achieved on 16 May 1976 at a competition in Götzis.

== Achievements ==
Year	Tournament	Venue	Result	Points
1970	European Junior Championships	Paris, France	4th	6,943
1971	European Championships	Helsinki, Finland	5th	7,842
1972	Olympic Games	Munich, West Germany	9th	7,741
1974	European Championships	Rome, Italy	7th	7,792
1975	Universiade	Rome, Italy	1st	7,820
1976	Olympic Games	Montreal, Canada	DNF	
1977	Universiade	Sofia, Bulgaria	1st	7,961
1978	European Championships	Prague, Czechoslovakia	4th	7,988
1979	Universiade	Mexico City, Mexico	1st	8,194
1980	Olympic Games	Moscow, Soviet Union	5th	8,007
