= Ryszard Katus =

Polish athlete (born 1947)

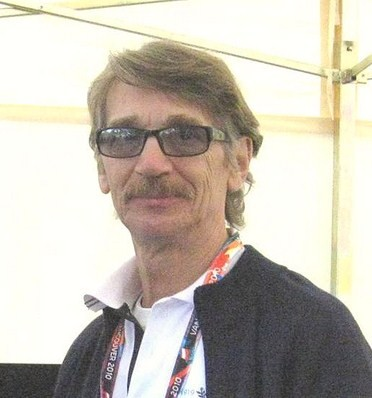

Personal information
- Born: 29 March 1947 (age 79) Boska Wola, Poland

Sport
- Sport: Track and field
Medal record
Representing Poland
Summer Olympics
Bronze medal – third place	1972 Munich	Decathlon

Ryszard Katus (born March 29, 1947) is a Polish athlete, who competed mainly in the men's decathlon event during his career.

Katus was born in Boska Wola. He competed for Poland at the 1972 Summer Olympics held in Munich, Germany, where he won the bronze medal in the men's decathlon event.

He later came to the United States and competed in Masters athletics under the name Richard Katus.
