= Leonid Lytvynenko =

Soviet decathlete (born 1949)

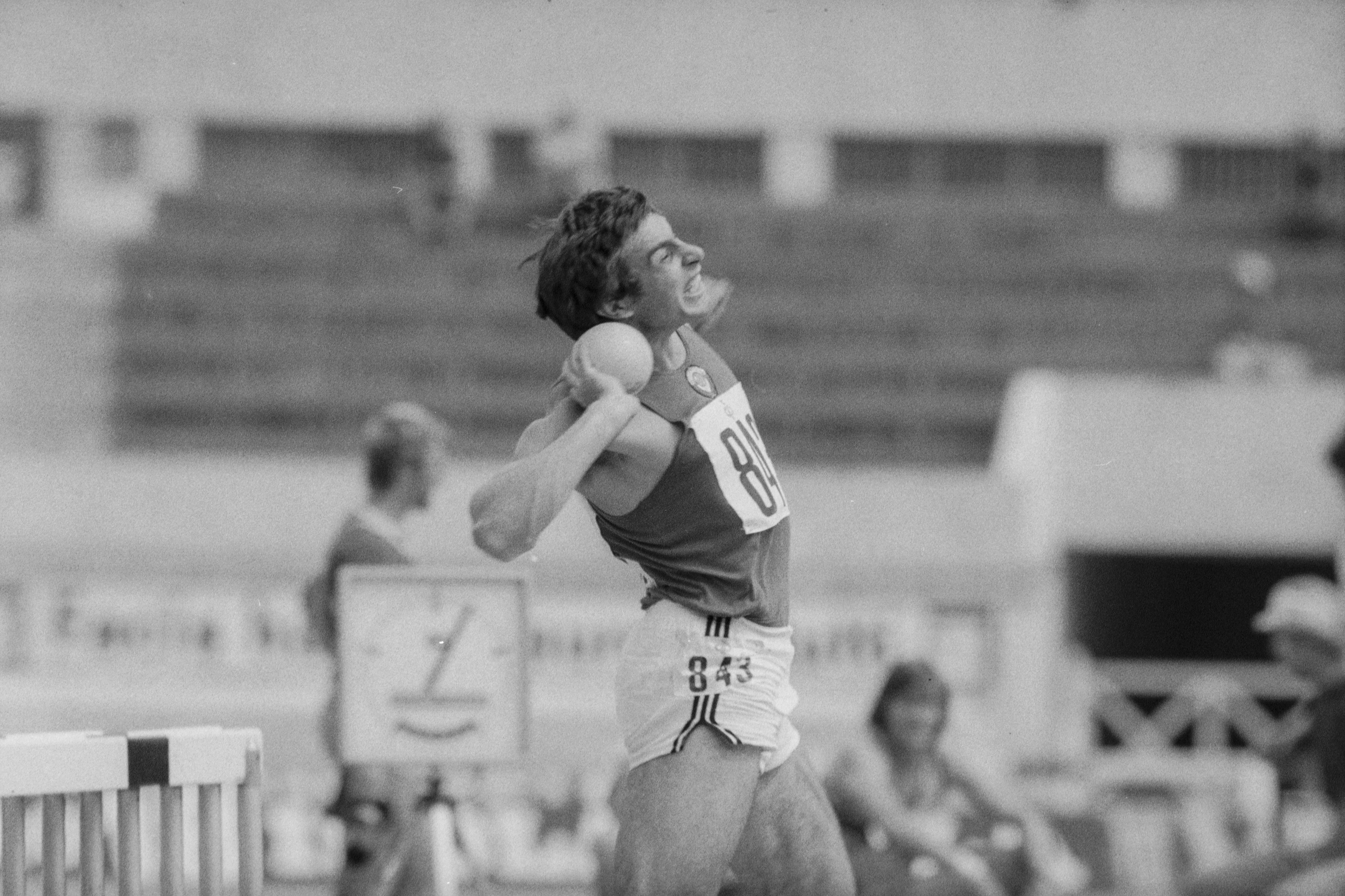
- Lytvynenko in 1974

Personal information
- Native name: Ukrainian: Леонід Литвиненко; Russian: Леони́д Дми́триевич Литвине́нко
- Full name: Leonid Dmitriyevich Litvinenko
- Born: 28 January 1949 (age 77) Smila, Ukrainian SSR, Soviet Union

Sport
- Country: Soviet Union
- Sport: Athletics
Medal record
Olympic Games
Silver medal – second place	1972 Munich	Decathlon

Leonid Lytvynenko (Ukrainian: Леонід Литвиненко, Russian: Леони́д Дми́триевич Литвине́нко, Leonid Dmitriyevich Litvinenko; born 28 January 1949) is a Soviet athlete who competed mainly in the Decathlon. He trained at Burevestnik in Kiev.

Lytvynenko began athletics at age 16. He was a member of the USSR National Team since 1969. He competed for the USSR in the 1972 Summer Olympics held in Munich in the Decathlon where he won the Silver medal. He was also the 1970 USSR Champion and the winner of the 5th Spartakiad of the Peoples of the USSR in decathlon. In 1972 Litvinenko was awarded the Order of the Badge of Honor.
