= Boris Ivanov (athlete) =

Soviet decathlete

Personal information
- Nationality: Soviet
- Born: 29 September 1947 (age 77); Ivanovo, Soviet Union

Sport
- Sport: Athletics
- Event: Decathlon

Boris Ivanov (born 29 September 1947) is a Soviet athlete. He competed in the men's decathlon at the 1972 Summer Olympics.
