= Franz Biedermann =

Liechtenstein athlete (born 1946)

Personal information
- Born: 4 May 1946 (age 80) Vaduz, Liechtenstein

Sport
- Sport: Athletics
- Event: Decathlon

Franz Biedermann (born 4 May 1946) is a Liechtenstein athlete. He competed in the men's decathlon at the 1968 Summer Olympics. It took place over two days from 18 October to 19 October. He achieved a total of 6323 points getting 19th place. He received 687 points in the 100 metres, 671 in long jump, 528 in shot put, 588 in high jump, 744 in the 400 metres, 797 in the 110 metres hurdles, 489 in discus throw, 780 in pole vault, 563 in javelin throw, and 476 in the 1500 metres.
