= Jean-Pierre Schoebel =

French decathlete

Personal information
- Born: 18 March 1949 (age 77) Grenoble, France

Sport
- Sport: Athletics
- Event: Decathlon

Jean-Pierre Schoebel (born 18 March 1949) is a French athlete. He competed in the men's decathlon at the 1972 Summer Olympics.
