= Roger Lespagnard =

Belgian decathlete

Roger Lespagnard (born 24 October 1946 in Ougrée, Belgium) is a former Belgian decathlete.

Lespagnard competed for his country at the 1968 Summer Olympics in Mexico City, Mexico, where he finished in seventeenth position in the decathlon event. He returned to both Munich and Montreal in the 1972 and 1976 Olympics, finishing fourteenth and nineteenth respectively.

He coached Nafissatou Thiam in the heptathlon, among others in the 2016 and 2020 Summer Olympics where she twice won the gold medal.

He also led a political career, having been member of the Federal House of Representatives (1994-1999) and was the former mayor of Fleron, up until 2018.
