= Luděk Pernica (decathlete) =

Czech decathlete

Personal information
- Nationality: Czech
- Born: 12 December 1949 (age 76) Nový Jičín, Czechoslovakia

Sport
- Sport: Athletics
- Event: Decathlon

Luděk Pernica (born 12 December 1949) is a Czech athlete. He competed in the men's decathlon at the 1976 Summer Olympics.
