= Barry King (decathlete) =

British decathlete (1945–2021)

Personal information
- Nationality: British (English)
- Born: 3 April 1945 Stoke-on-Trent, Great Britain
- Died: 27 March 2021 (aged 75) Colorado Springs, USA
- Height: 185 cm (6 ft 1 in)
- Weight: 90 kg (198 lb)

Sport
- Sport: Athletics
- Event: decathlon/discus
- Club: Hillingdon AC
Medal record
Representing England
Commonwealth Games
Silver medal – second place	1974 Christchurch	Decathlon
Bronze medal – third place	1970 Edinburgh	Decathlon

Barry John King (3 April 1945 – 27 March 2021) was a British Olympic decathlete who was later an author, corporate director, corporate board member and specialist in Olympic marketing and sports development.

== Biography ==
He was founder and chief executive officer of Outdoor-Fitness, LLC., co-founder of Sports Directions Corporation, and served as a director at the United States Olympic Committee for 14 years during the height of their organizational and fundraising successes.

King is co-author of a two-book series, published in association with the United States Olympic Committee, entitled The Olympic Challenge as well as Journey of the Olympic Flame. King assisted in creating an Olympic themed Iowa state school educational curriculum for K-12 students, again, in conjunction with the United States Olympic Committee. In film, he was the technical director of the Walt Disney motion picture, The World's Greatest Athlete.

== Athletics career ==
He grew up in England and obtained a track and field scholarship from the University of Colorado at Boulder in the United States. His first major international competition came when he represented England at the 1970 British Commonwealth Games, where he won the bronze medal in the decathlon.

He then took part in the 1972 Summer Olympics in Munich two years later, competing for Great Britain. He ranked fifteenth overall in the Olympic decathlon competition. He returned to the podium at the 1974 British Commonwealth Games in Christchurch, New Zealand, this time coming away with the silver medal.

He has held national records and became the British decathlon champion after winning the 1972 AAA Championships title. He won the British national pentathlon title, and also set the national record on 20 May 1970 in Santa Barbara, California.

== Personal life ==
King was married to Deanna Pinckney-King.
