= Régis Ghesquière =

Belgian decathlete (1949–2015)

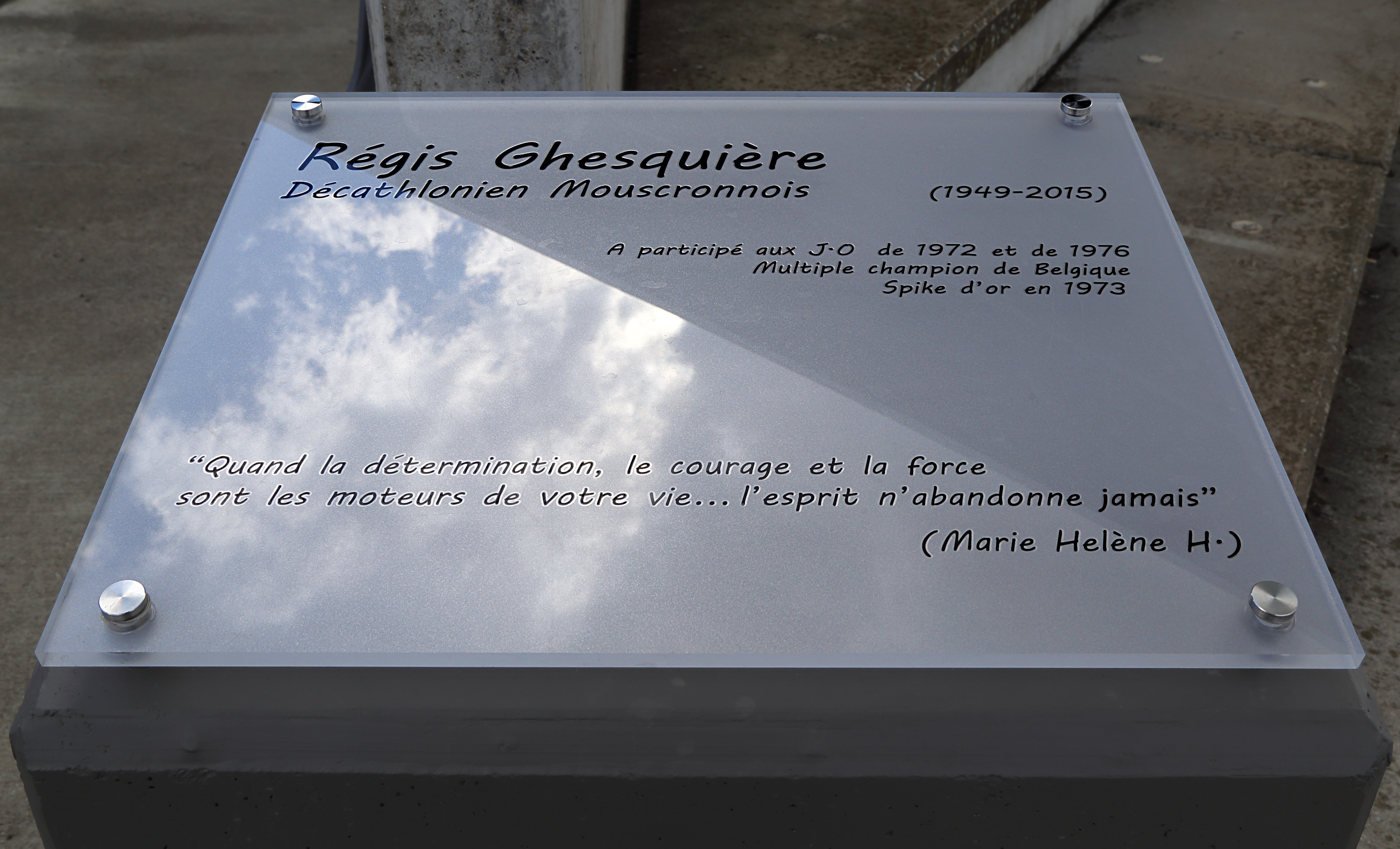
Commemorative plaque in honour of Régis Ghesquière at the Furturosport in Mouscron, Belgium.

Régis Ghesquière (15 July 1949 – 22 April 2015) was a Belgian decathlete.

Ghesquière was born in Mouscron in 1949. He competed for his country at the 1972 Summer Olympics in Munich, Germany where he finished in eleventh place. He returned four years later at the 1976 Summer Olympics in Montreal, Canada, but was unable to finish. He won the Belgian decathlon title four times: In 1972, 1974, 1974 and 1979.

Ghesquière died on 22 April 2015 of a heart attack.
