= Ryszard Skowronek =

Polish decathlete (born 1949)

Personal information
- Nationality: Polish
- Born: 1 May 1949 (age 77) Jelenia Góra, Poland
- Died: Poland

Sport
- Sport: Track and field athletics
- Event: Decathlon
Medal record
Men's athletics
Representing Poland
European Championships
Gold medal – first place	1974 Rome	Decathlon
Universiade
Gold medal – first place	1973 Rome	Decathlon

Ryszard Skowronek (born 1 May 1949 in Jelenia Góra) is a retired decathlete from Poland. He set his personal best in the event (8208 points) on 21 June 1973 at a meet in Warsaw.

== Achievements ==
Year	Tournament	Venue	Result	Points
1972	Olympic Games	Munich, West Germany	DNF	
1973	Universiade	Moscow, Soviet Union	1st	
1974	European Championships	Rome, Italy	1st	8207 pts
1976	Olympic Games	Montreal, Canada	5th	8113
