= Self-coup =

Elected leader illegally maintaining or increasing power

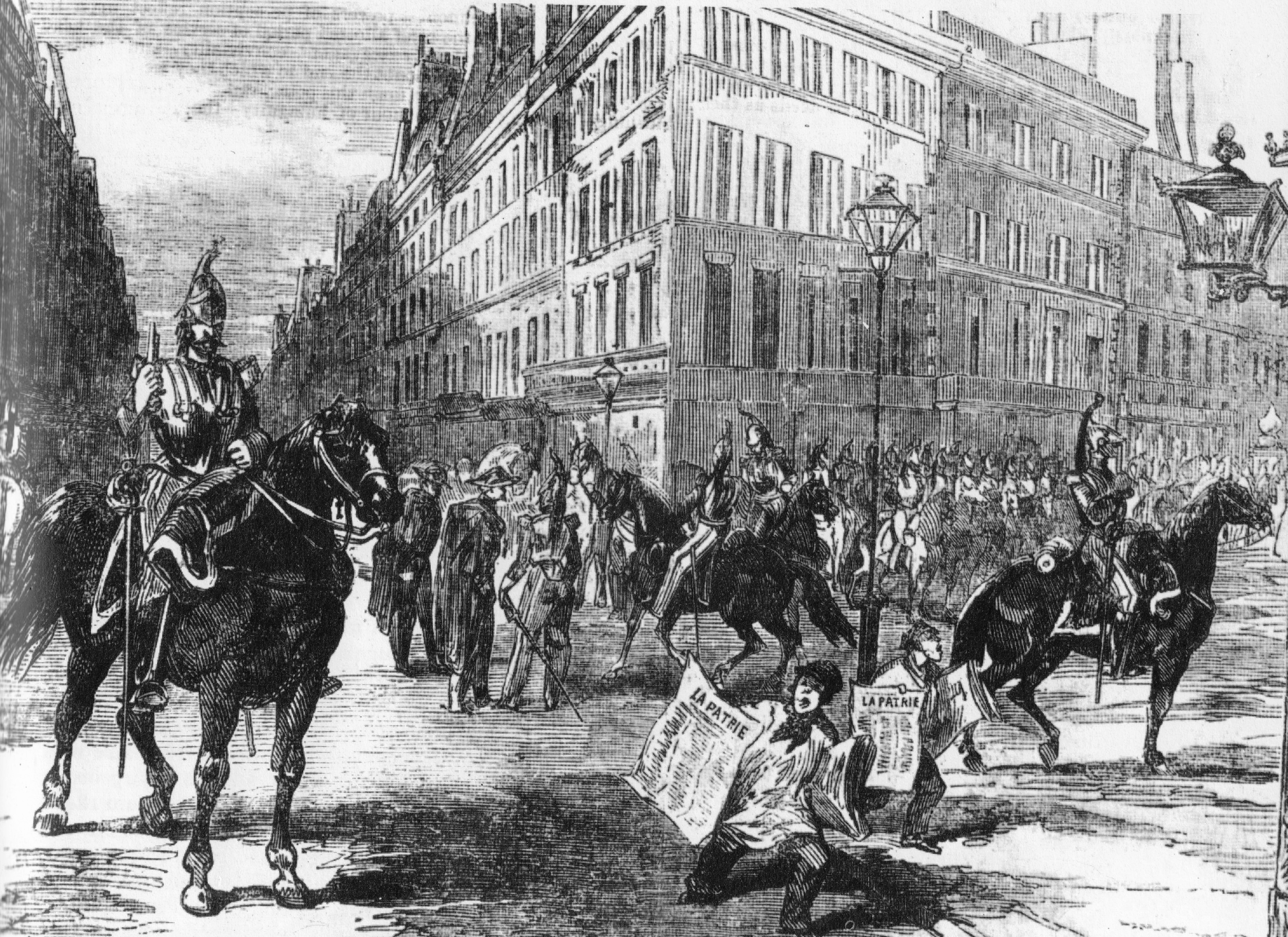
Cavalry in the streets of Paris, after President Louis-Napoléon Bonaparte seized dictatorial power in the 1851 French coup d'état

A self-coup, also called an autocoup (from Spanish autogolpe) or coup from the top, is a form of coup d'état in which a political leader uses illegal means to stay in office or to vastly increase their power. The leader may dissolve or render powerless the national legislature and unlawfully assume extraordinary powers. Other measures may include annulling the constitution, suspending civil courts, and having the head of government assume dictatorial powers.

From 1946 to the beginning of 2021, an estimated 148 self-coup attempts took place, 110 in autocracies and 38 in democracies.

== List of self-coups ==
- Roman Republic: Julius Caesar (February 44 BC; when declared dictator perpetuo)
- Central America: President Manuel José Arce (October 10, 1826)
- France: President Louis-Napoléon Bonaparte (December 2, 1851)
- Uruguay: President Juan Lindolfo Cuestas (February 10, 1898)
- Austria: Chancellor Engelbert Dollfuss (March 15, 1933)
- Germany: Chancellor Adolf Hitler (March 23, 1933 / August 2, 1934)
- Uruguay: President Gabriel Terra (March 31, 1933)
- Estonia: Prime Minister in duties of the State Elder Konstantin Päts (March 12, 1934)
- Latvia: Prime Minister Karlis Ulmanis (May 15–16, 1934)
- Brazil: President Getúlio Vargas (November 10, 1937)
- Uruguay: President Alfredo Baldomir (February 21, 1942)
- Romania: King Michael I of Romania (August 23, 1944)
- Bolivia: President Mamerto Urriolagoitía (May 16, 1951)
- Pakistan: Governor-General Ghulam Muhammad (April 1953 – September 21, 1954)
- Indonesia: President Sukarno (July 5, 1959)
- Philippines: President Ferdinand Marcos (September 23, 1972)
- South Korea: President Park Chung Hee (October 17, 1972)
- Swaziland: King Sobhuza II (April 12, 1973)
- Uruguay: President Juan María Bordaberry (June 27, 1973)
- Peru: President Alberto Fujimori (April 5, 1992)
- Russia: President Boris Yeltsin (September 21, 1993) (Note: Attributed to multiple sources:)
- Cambodia: Prime Minister Hun Sen (July 1997)
- Venezuela: President Nicolás Maduro (March 29, 2017)
- Peru: President Martín Vizcarra (September 30, 2019)
- Malaysia: Prime Minister Muhyiddin Yassin (February 29, 2020)
- Russia: President Vladimir Putin (July 4, 2020)
- El Salvador: President Nayib Bukele (May 1, 2021)
- Tunisia: President Kais Saied (July 25, 2021)
- Sudan: Chairman of the Sovereignty Council Abdel Fattah al-Burhan (October 25, 2021)

== Notable events described as attempted self-coups ==
- Guatemala: President Jorge Serrano Elías (May 25 – June 5, 1993)
- Indonesia: President Abdurrahman Wahid (July 1–25, 2001)
- Malaysia: Prime Minister Mahathir Mohamad (February 23 – March 1, 2020)
- United States: President Donald Trump (November 4, 2020 – January 6, 2021; after election loss)
- Peru: President Pedro Castillo (December 7, 2022)
- Brazil: President Jair Bolsonaro (October 30, 2022 – December 31, 2022; January 8, 2023; after election loss)
- Israel: Prime Minister Benjamin Netanyahu (ongoing events, since he assumed office on December 29, 2022) (Note: Attributed to multiple sources:)
- South Korea: President Yoon Suk Yeol (December 3–4, 2024)
- United States: President Donald Trump (ongoing events, such as the targeting of political opponents and civil society, since the start of his second term on January 20, 2025)

== See also ==
- Constitutional coup
- Democratic backsliding
- Soft coup
