= Mykola Avilov =

Former Soviet Decathlete

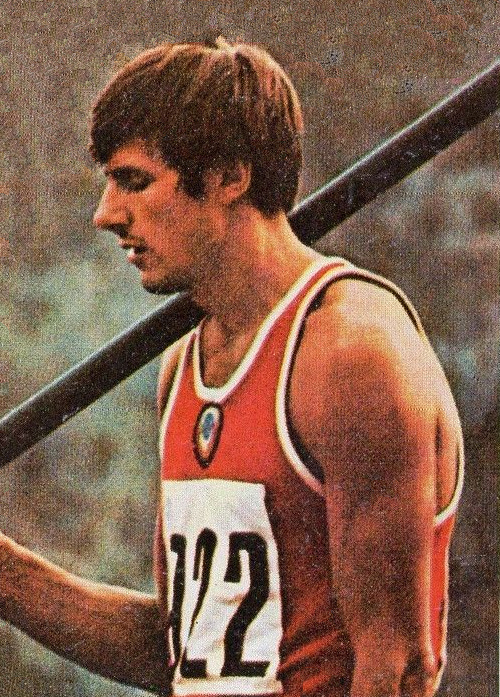
- Mykola Avilov in 1972

Personal information
- Born: 6 August 1948 (age 77) Odesa, Ukrainian SSR, Soviet Union
- Height: 1.91 m (6 ft 3 in)
- Weight: 89 kg (196 lb)

Sport
- Sport: Athletics
- Event: Decathlon
- Club: Dynamo Odesa

Achievements and titles
- Personal best: 8,466 (1972)
Medal record
Representing Soviet Union
Olympic Games
Gold medal – first place	1972 Munich	Decathlon
Bronze medal – third place	1976 Montreal	Decathlon
Universiade
Gold medal – first place	1970 Turin	Decathlon
Silver medal – second place	1973 Moscow	Decathlon

Mykola Viktorovych Avilov (Ukrainian: Микола Вікторович Авілов, Russian: Николай Викторович Авилов, born 6 August 1948) is a retired Ukrainian Soviet decathlete who competed at the 1968, 1972 and 1976 Olympics. He won a gold medal in 1972, setting a new world record, a bronze in 1976, and finished fourth in 1968. He is the only Olympic champion in decathlon from the Soviet Union.

Unusually tall for his time Avilov first played basketball, then changed to high jump in 1962, and only in 1966 turned to decathlon. He won that event at the 1970 Universiade and finished second in 1973. In 1971 he married Valentyna Kozyr, an Olympic high jumper. Avilov retired in 1980 after finishing fifth at the Soviet Championships. He then coached athletics in Ukraine, Iraq, China, Egypt and the Seychelles.

In the 2015 Odesa regional election Avilov was elected into the Odesa Oblast parliament as the first of the Petro Poroshenko Bloc's election ballot.

Records
Preceded by (United States) Bill Toomey	Men's decathlon world record holder 8 September 1972 – 10 August 1975	Succeeded by (United States) Bruce Jenner
