= Jorge Serrano Elías =

President of Guatemala from 1991 to 1993

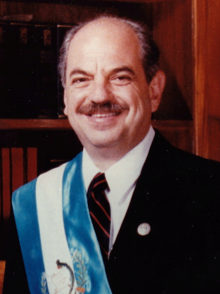
- Official portrait, 1991

41st President of Guatemala
- In office January 14, 1991 – June 1, 1993
- Vice President: Gustavo Adolfo Espina Salguero
- Preceded by: Vinicio Cerezo
- Succeeded by: Gustavo Adolfo Espina Salguero

Personal details
- Born: 26 April 1945 (age 81) Guatemala City
- Party: Solidarity Action Movement
- Spouse: Magda Bianchi de Serrano
- Children: 5

Jorge Antonio Serrano Elías (born April 26, 1945) is a Guatemalan industrial engineer and politician who served as the 41st president of Guatemala from January 14, 1991 to June 1, 1993. He attempted a self-coup in May 1993 to stay longer in power.

== Life and career ==
Serrano was born on 26 April 1945 in Guatemala City as the son of Jorge Adán Serrano and Rosa Elías, who was of Lebanese descent. After attending Liceo Guatemala he graduated from the University of San Carlos with a degree in industrial engineering. Then, attended Stanford University in California, U.S., where he studied economic growth and gained a doctorate in education and science. He then returned to Guatemala to become a civil servant. In 1976, he collaborated with various American Protestant churches to help the population recover from the devastating earthquake that had afflicted the country. He then published a document describing the wretched conditions under which the indigenous people lived, which resulted in him receiving threats. He went into exile in the U.S., only returning in 1982 to work in the government of fellow evangelical General Efraín Ríos Montt as Vice President of the Advisory Board to the government.

In 1985, Serrano stood as presidential candidate for the Democratic Party of National Co-operation (PDCN) and the Revolutionary Party (PR), coming third with 12.6% of the vote. In September 1987, as the political party's representative, he became one of the four members of the National Reconciliation Commission (CNR).

== Presidency (1991–1993) ==
Serrano became the presidential candidate for the Solidarity Action Movement (MAS) in the 1990 presidential elections. He lost the first round on November 11 with 24.1% of the vote but won the second round against Jorge Carpio on January 6, 1991 with 68.1%. Carpio unsuccessfully tried to use Serrano's fundamentalist beliefs against him as a campaign issue.

On January 14, Serrano replaced Vinicio Cerezo as President of Guatemala. He was the second non-Catholic to gain power in Guatemala after Ríos Montt. The transfer of power marked the first time in decades that an incumbent president had peacefully surrendered power to an elected opposition victor. As his party gained only 18 of 116 seats in Congress, Serrano entered into a tenuous alliance with the Christian Democrats and Carpio's National Union of the Center (UCN).

The Serrano administration's record was mixed. It succeeded in consolidating civilian control over the army, replacing several senior officers, and persuading the military to participate in peace talks with the URNG. He took the politically unpopular step of recognizing the sovereignty of Belize. The Serrano administration reversed the economic slide it inherited, reducing inflation and boosting real growth.

On May 25, 1993, Serrano sparked the 1993 Guatemalan constitutional crisis when he illegally suspended the constitution, dissolved Congress and the Supreme Court, imposed censorship, and tried to restrict civil freedoms, allegedly to fight corruption. The attempted self-coup was similar to the one Peru's Alberto Fujimori carried out. However, Serrano's action met with strong protests by most elements of Guatemalan society, at the forefront of which was the Siglo Veintiuno newspaper under the leadership of José Rubén Zamora. This was combined with international pressure and the army's enforcement of the decisions of the Constitutional Court, which ruled against the attempted takeover. In the face of this pressure, Serrano resigned as president on June 1 and fled the country. He was replaced on an interim basis by his vice president, Gustavo Adolfo Espina Salguero. However, Espina was also involved in Serrano's self-coup, and Congress replaced him with Human Rights Ombudsman Ramiro de León Carpio.

== Post-presidency ==
Serrano now resides in Panama with his wife, Magda Bianchi de Serrano. He has a set of twin sons, a son named Juan Pablo Serrano, and two daughters. He has three sisters, one of whom is Olga Stella Serrano de Salazar, who resides in Guatemala City with her husband, Rafael Salazar Farfan. The Guatemalan government has made numerous unsuccessful attempts to have him extradited on corruption charges. Jorge Serrano is involved in real estate as a developer and investor in Panama and the U.S. state of Florida.

Political offices
Preceded by Vinicio Cerezo	President of Guatemala; January 14, 1991–June 1, 1993	Succeeded by Gustavo Adolfo Espina Salguero
