= Athletics at the 1965 Summer Universiade – Men's decathlon =

The men's decathlon event at the 1965 Summer Universiade was held at the People's Stadium in Budapest on 26 and 27 August 1965.

== Results ==
Rank	Athlete	Nationality	100m	LJ	SP	HJ	400m	110m H	DT	PV	JT	1500m	Points	Notes
1st place, gold medalist(s)	Bill Toomey	United States	10.7w	7.18	12.58	1.80	48.5	15.6	42.32	3.80	59.36	4:26.7	7566	
2nd place, silver medalist(s)	József Bakai	Hungary	10.7w	7.18	12.58	1.80	48.5	15.6	42.32	3.80	59.36	4:26.7	7443	
3rd place, bronze medalist(s)	Manfred Pflugbeil	West Germany	11.0w	6.90w	14.10	1.86	50.0	15.1w	39.28	3.70	54.95	4:28.1	7413w	
4	Eduard Ortsiyev	Soviet Union	11.3w	7.08w	1467	1.70	52.1	16.0w	44.82	4.40	58.40	4:37.9	7356	
5	Bernard Castang	France	11.3	6.91w	14.93	1.75	50.0	15.8w	42.90	3.50	53.58	4:31.6	7198w	
6	Curt Socol	Romania	11.3w	6.84	13.15	1.92	52.4	15.2w	42.34	3.40	58.10	4:33.9	7189	
7	Urs Trautmann	Switzerland	11.2w	6.38	13.40	1.83	53.2	15.8w	37.04	3.70	57.64	4:44.4	6863	
8	Ed de Noorlander	Netherlands	11.5	6.66	12.52	1.89	53.3	15.5w	33.82	3.60	49.28	4:36.4	6721w	
9	Josef Habr	Czechoslovakia											6521	
10	Walter Diessl	Austria											6437	
11	Yordan Miyakov	Bulgaria											6336	
12	Mario Piccolo	Italy											6213	
13	Jim Smith	Great Britain											6186	
	Rein Aun	Soviet Union	11.2	7.31	13.10	DNS	–	–	–	–	–	–	DNF	
	Alois Büchel	Liechtenstein											DNF	
	Vasile Muresan	Romania											DNF	
	Jürgen Schäps	West Germany											DNF	
	Norrie Foster	Great Britain	DNF	DNS	–	–	–	–	–	–	–	–	DNF	
