= 1966 European Athletics Championships – Men's decathlon =

Men's decathlon at the European Athletics Championships

The men's decathlon at the 1966 European Athletics Championships was held in Budapest, Hungary, at Népstadion on 30 August and 1 September 1966.

== Medalists ==
Gold	Werner von Moltke; West Germany
Silver	Jörg Mattheis; West Germany
Bronze	Horst Beyer; West Germany

== Results ==
=== Final ===
30 August/1 September

The highest mark recorded in each event is highlighted in yellow

Rank	Name	Nationality	100m	LJ	SP	HJ	400m	110m H	DT	PV	JT	1500m	Points	Notes
1st place, gold medalist(s)	Werner von Moltke	West Germany	11.0	7.18	15.55	1.85	50.1	15.1	45.74	4.20	62.96	4:53.5	7607 (7740)	
2nd place, silver medalist(s)	Jörg Mattheis	West Germany	11.3	7.17	14.45	1.88	50.0	16.2w	45.48	3.70	67.98	4:26.9	7478 (7614)	
3rd place, bronze medalist(s)	Horst Beyer	West Germany	11.5	6.89	14.73	1.88	49.5	14.9	41.80	4.10	56.36	4:17.9	7479 (7562)	
4	Max Klauß	East Germany	11.0	7.61	12.94	1.91	49.8	16.7w	40.38	4.35	53.10	4:44.6	7280 (7446)	
5	Rein Aun	Soviet Union	11.3	7.01	13.52	1.85	50.6	16.0w	42.76	4.10	57.60	4:32.8	7210 (7378)	
6	Jüri Otsmaa	Soviet Union	11.4	6.83	13.93	1.94	51.3	15.4	38.02	3.80	53.48	4:31.4	7054 (7236)	
7	Mykhaylo Storozhenko	Soviet Union	11.5	6.95	14.48	1.88	54.5	15.1w	45.18	4.00	54.76	4:57.5	7002 (7172)	
8	Werner Duttweiler	Switzerland	11.4	6.95	13.52	1.85	52.4	15.4w	36.66	4.40	53.06	4:42.0	6999 (7165)	
9	Clive Longe	Great Britain	11.3	6.62	15.09	1.70	51.7	15.6w	46.46	4.00	55.60	4:49.9	6996 (7160)	
10	Walter Dießl	Austria	11.1	6.74	13.79	1.75	51.3	15.1	38.96	4.00	46.96	4:42.0	6869 (7055)	
11	Manfred Tiedtke	East Germany	11.3	6.83	14.66	1.91	50.6	15.4	38.26	3.50	53.40	5:04.6	6849 (7035)	
12	Franco Sar	Italy	11.5	6.21	13.61	1.75	53.2	14.9w	47.58	4.10	52.42	5:06.6	6735 (6904)	
13	Jerzy Detko	Poland	11.5	6.59	14.22	1.88	52.0	15.5w	43.28	3.80	54.30	4:47.2	6922 (6896)	
14	Steen Smidt-Jensen	Denmark	11.5	6.59	11.94	1.85	52.0	15.5w	36.12	4.30	42.45	4:25.8	6713 (6887)	
15	Gert Herunter	Austria	11.1	6.77	11.78	1.85	50.6	15.2w	34.22	3.60	48.76	4:38.6	6703 (6883)	
16	Bruno Poserina	Italy	11.8	6.70	13.45	1.75	52.3	15.3w	48.32	3.20	53.08	4:26.2	6802 (6856)	
17	Horst Mandl	Austria	11.6	7.02	12.88	1.85	52.4	15.4	36.20	3.70	52.24	4:49.8	6671 (6847)	
18	Derek Clarke	Great Britain	11.7	6.32	13.09	1.60	51.8	15.7	42.92	3.40	58.46	4:24.5	6601 (6842)	
19	Tadeusz Grzegorzewski	Poland	11.4	6.64	12.82	1.70	53.1	15.5	42.16	4.20	57.78	5:11.8	6665 (6833)	
20	Bernard Castang	France	11.3	6.54	14.55	1.75	50.6	16.5	43.82	3.20	50.68	5:04.0	6516 (6709)	
21	Urs Trautmann	Switzerland	11.9	6.11	13.46	1.85	53.5	16.4w	41.58	3.60	58.20	4:44.2	6487 (6673)	
22	Gyula Hubai	Hungary	11.6	6.24	12.83	1.80	53.1	16.5	43.08	4.45	46.38	5:07.5	6454 (6650)	
23	Robert Lespagnard	Belgium	11.5	6.47	11.78	1.80	50.6	16.6w	30.08	4.10	45.60	4:30.0	6416 (6601)	
24	Charlemagne Anyamah	France	11.2	6.33	13.49	1.75	51.4	15.9w	36.36	3.30	46.78	4:57.4	6306 (6502)	
25	Suat Jegeni	Albania	11.9	6.28	10.85	1.70	53.4	17.4	35.18	3.70	40.94	4:22.4	5924 (6131)	
	József Bákái	Hungary	11.4	6.65	13.39	1.70	53.4	16.3w	47.34	4.00	NM		DNF	
	Roland Sedleger	Switzerland	11.2	6.84	11.75								DNF	
	Valbjörn Þorláksson	Iceland	DNF										DNF	

== Participation ==
According to an unofficial count, 28 athletes from 14 countries participated in the event.

- Albania (1)
- Austria (3)
- Belgium (1)
- Denmark (1)
- East Germany (2)
- France (2)
- Hungary (2)
- Iceland (1)
- Italy (2)
- Poland (2)
- Soviet Union (3)
- Switzerland (3)
- Great Britain (2)
- West Germany (3)
