= Athletics at the 1967 Summer Universiade – Men's decathlon =

The men's decathlon event at the 1967 Summer Universiade was held at the National Olympic Stadium in Tokyo on 2 and 3 September 1967.

== Results ==
Rank	Athlete	Nationality	100m	LJ	SP	HJ	400m	110m H	DT	PV	JT	1500m	Points	Notes
1st place, gold medalist(s)	Hans-Joachim Walde	West Germany	11.1	7.45	14.79	2.00	49.7	15.4	45.18	4.00	64.96	4:51.4	7818	UR
2nd place, silver medalist(s)	Jörg Mattheis	West Germany	11.5	7.18	14.38	1.88	50.0	1.67	45.18	4.00	67.48	4:42.7	7486	
3rd place, bronze medalist(s)	Bernard Castang	France	11.4	6.71	14.38	1.85	49.5	1.60	44.26	4.20	53.38	4:25.8	7444	
4	Gert Herunter	Austria	10.8	7.05	13.59	1.91	48.5	15.2	37.26	3.80	52.84	4:47.4	7400	
5	Lennart Hedmark	Sweden	11.7	7.12	13.39	1.91	50.1	15.1	43.04	3.80	59.24	4:43.2	7349	
6	Clive Longe	Great Britain	11.2	7.03	14.50	1.80	51.2	15.4	44.70	4.10	56.26	4:55.8	7334	
7	Ed de Noorlander	Netherlands	11.3	7.04	14.03	1.91	50.8	15.2	37.08	3.90	46.62	4:22.8	7300	
8	Urs Trautmann	Switzerland	11.8	6.88	14.46	2.00	52.2	15.8	46.48	3.60	62.08	4:49.3	7274	
9	Frank Vravnik	Yugoslavia	11.4	6.23	14.64	1.75	51.1	15.7	45.68	4.10	51.54	4:46.2	7067	
10	Rafael Cano	Spain	11.2	6.98	9.40	1.88	49.1	15.4	31.36	3.70	46.46	4:37.3	6750	
11	Mitsuyasu Ochiai	Japan											6300	
	Yasuo Kaifu	Japan											DNF	
	Hansruedi Kunz	Switzerland											DNF	
