= 1969 European Athletics Championships – Men's decathlon =

Men's decathlon at the European Athletics Championships

The men's decathlon at the 1969 European Athletics Championships was held in Athens, Greece, at Georgios Karaiskakis Stadium on 17 and 18 September 1969.

== Medalists ==
Gold	Joachim Kirst; East Germany
Silver	Herbert Wessel; East Germany
Bronze	Viktor Chelnokov; Soviet Union

== Results ==
=== Final ===
17-18 September 1969

The highest mark recorded in each event is highlighted in yellow

Rank	Name	Nationality	100m	LJ	SP	HJ	400m	110m H	DT	PV	JT	1500m	Points	Notes
1st place, gold medalist(s)	Joachim Kirst	East Germany	10.8	7.62	16.28	2.13	47.9	15.9	44.70	4.10	57.60	4:58.7	7910 (8041)	CR
2nd place, silver medalist(s)	Herbert Wessel	East Germany	10.9	7.37 w	14.21	1.98	49.6	15.4	40.98	4.60	54.16	4:37.0	7683 (7828)	
3rd place, bronze medalist(s)	Viktor Chelnokov	Soviet Union	10.9	6.98 w	15.12	1.86	49.0	16.7	47.34	4.10	67.86	4:31.5	7653 (7801)	
4	Nikolay Avilov	Soviet Union	11.4	7.40 w	13.39	2.04	49.2	15.0	41.86	4.10	58.76	4:28.9	7648 (7779)	
5	Rüdiger Demmig	East Germany	11.1	7.03 w	13.38	1.89	48.0	15.0	43.56	4.20	53.12	4:37.0	7469 (7631)	
6	Horst Mandl	Austria	11.3	7.15	13.38	1.92	49.8	15.1	40.00	4.40	58.42	4:38.8	7439 (7579)	
7	Lennart Hedmark	Sweden	11.4	7.13 w	13.62	1.89	50.2	15.5	42.44	4.10	66.64	4:42.3	7402 (7531)	
8	Urs Trautmann	Switzerland	11.3	7.04 w	14.17	1.95	50.8	15.9	44.60	3.90	61.86	4:42.6	7332 (7487)	
9	Leonid Litvinenko	Soviet Union	11.1	7.13 w	13.90	1.83	49.2	15.0	41.02	3.40	54.08	4:24.3	7245 (7410)	
10	Spas Dzhurov	Bulgaria	11.1	6.79 w	15.02	1.83	50.3	15.7	41.38	4.10	55.36	4:41.6	7204 (7384)	
11	József Bákái	Hungary	11.2	7.26 w	14.32	1.89	52.1	16.6	46.46	4.20	60.84	5:11.0	7167 (7334)	
12	Charlemagne Anyanah	France	11.1	6.65	13.67	1.89	50.2	15.3	38.50	4.00	59.48	4:44.8	7146 (7321)	
13	Tadeusz Janczenko	Poland	10.9	7.28 w	12.81	1.92	50.4	17.1	40.48	4.00	53.10	5:01.1	6956 (7163)	
14	Hannu Kyösola	Finland	11.2	7.46	13.09	1.80	50.1	16.0	35.54	3.30	61.90	4:35.8	6979 (7113)	
15	Steen Smidt-Jensen	Denmark	11.2	6.81 w	11.99	2.01	50.8	15.1	40.38	4.00	53.10	5:01.1	7011 (7091)	
16	Jan Neckář	Czechoslovakia	11.7	6.50 w	13.01	1.92	52.9	15.9	40.36	3.70	68.16	4:36.4	6927 (7077)	
17	Yordan Miyakov	Bulgaria	11.6	6.49 w	14.26	1.75	53.2	16.1	41.84	4.10	61.44	4:40.9	6851 (7016)	
18	Rafael Cano	Spain	11.2	7.17 w	11.22	1.89	50.0	15.8	33.42	3.90	52.32	4:40.6	6841 (7005)	
19	Vasilios Sevastis	Greece	11.5	7.45 w	12.00	NH	50.6	16.2	36.02	3.50	51.80	4:30.2	6120 (6768)	
20	Franz Biedermann	Liechtenstein	11.7	6.61 w	10.23	1.80	51.3	16.4	33.16	4.10	57.64	4:30.0	6542 (6696)	
	Freddy Herbrandt	Belgium	11.3	7.55 w	13.49	1.98	57.3	16.5	42.18	4.00	44.88		DNF	
	Clive Longe	Great Britain	11.2	6.84 w	14.22	1.75	49.7	15.5	42.86	4.40	NM		DNF	
	Arthur Hess	Switzerland	10.9	7.25 w	13.53	1.80							DNF	
	Edward de Noorlander	Netherlands	11.4	7.02 w	13.46	2.01	49.2	15.1	40.40	4.10	50.94	4:20.5	DQ ^{†}	

^{†}:The Dutch athlete Edward de Noorlander initially finished 6th, but was disqualified for the use of amphetamine. This was the first disqualification for doping in athletics.

== Participation ==
According to an unofficial count, 24 athletes from 18 countries participated in the event.

- Austria (1)
- Belgium (1)
- Bulgaria (2)
- Czechoslovakia (1)
- Denmark (1)
- East Germany (3)
- Finland (1)
- France (1)
- Greece (1)
- Hungary (1)
- Liechtenstein (1)
- Netherlands (1)
- Poland (1)
- Soviet Union (3)
- Spain (1)
- Sweden (1)
- Switzerland (2)
- Great Britain (1)
