= Kawno =

Kawno may refer to the following places:

- Kawno, Kuyavian-Pomeranian Voivodeship (north-central Poland)
- Kawno, Choszczno County in West Pomeranian Voivodeship (north-west Poland)
- Kawno, Sławno County in West Pomeranian Voivodeship (north-west Poland)
