= Athletics at the 1968 Summer Olympics – Men's decathlon =

Men's Decathlon at the Games of the XIX Olympiad
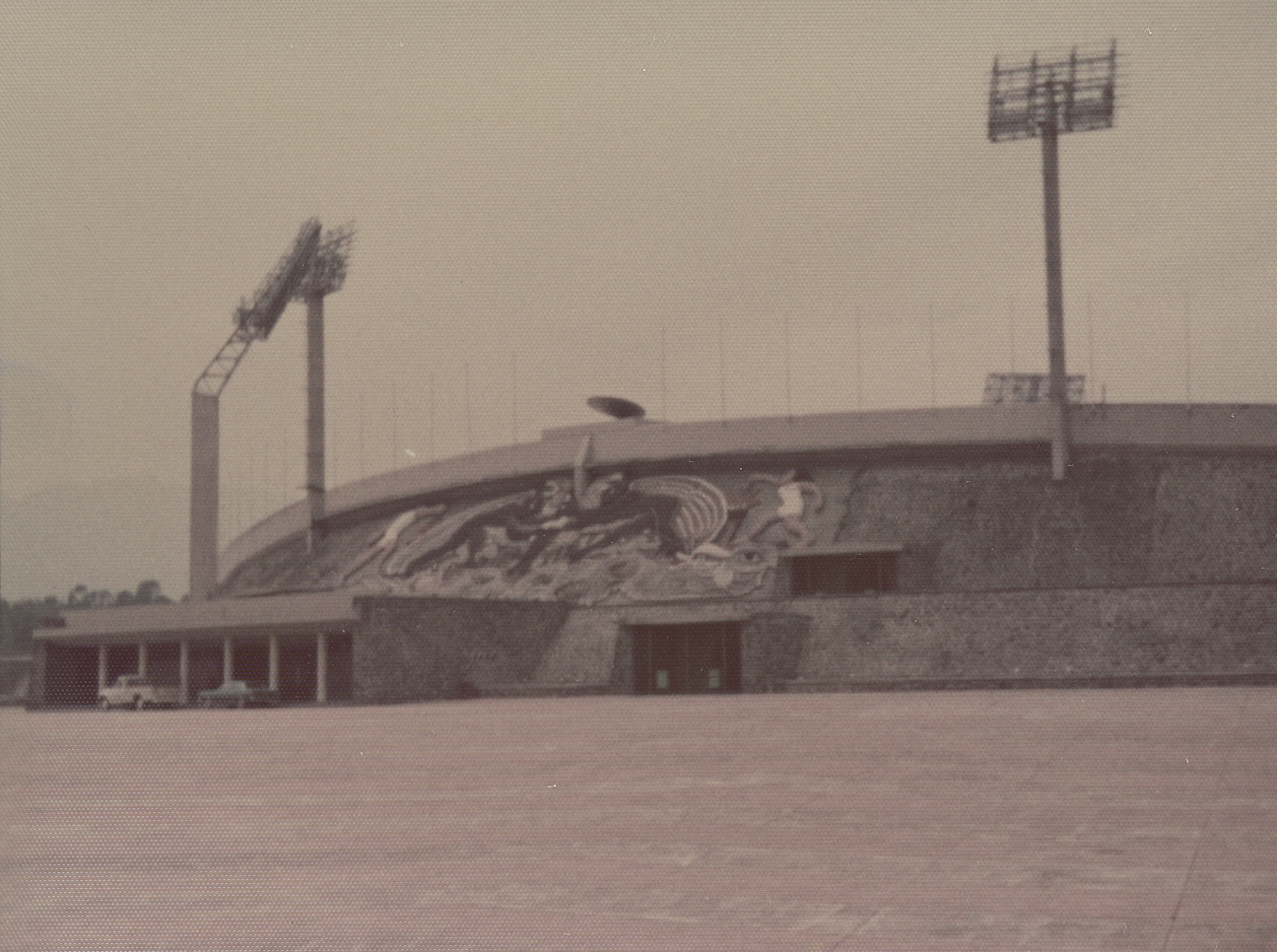
- The exterior of the host stadium in Mexico City
- Venue: Estadio Olímpico Universitario, Mexico City
- Dates: 18 & 19 October 1968
- Competitors: 33 from 20 nations
- Winning score: 8311

Medalists
| 1st place, gold medalist(s) | | Bill Toomey; United States |
| 2nd place, silver medalist(s) | | Hans-Joachim Walde; West Germany |
| 3rd place, bronze medalist(s) | | Kurt Bendlin; West Germany |

The men's decathlon competition featured as part of the athletics programme at the 1968 Summer Olympics and was held at the Estadio Olímpico Universitario in Mexico City on 18 and 19 October.

American Bill Toomey won the gold medal with an Olympic record score of 8193 points. Two West German athletes, Hans-Joachim Walde and Kurt Bendlin, took the silver and bronze medals, respectively.

A total of 33 competitors from 20 nations entered the decathlon with 19 athletes managing to finish all events at the competition.

The ten-event track and field competition used hand timing in the track events and was scored using the 1962 scoring method. The youngest competitor was Don Vélez (aged 20) and the oldest was Valbjörn Þorláksson (aged 34). The sixth-placer Tom Waddell, representing the United States, later went on to found the Gay Olympics.

== Schedule ==
| Date | Round |
|---|---|
| Friday, 18 October 1968 | 100 metres Long jump Shot put High jump 400 metres |
| Saturday, 19 October 1968 | 110 metres hurdles Discus throw Pole vault Javelin throw 1500 metres |

== Overall summary ==
| Rank | Athlete | Overall points | 100 m | LJ | SP | HJ | 400 m | 110 m H | DT | PV | JT | 1500 m |
|---|---|---|---|---|---|---|---|---|---|---|---|---|
| 1st place, gold medalist(s) | Bill Toomey (USA) | 8193 | 10.4 | 7.87 | 13.75 | 1.95 | 45.6 WDB | 14.9 | 43.68 | 4.20 | 62.80 | 4:57.1 |
| 2nd place, silver medalist(s) | Hans-Joachim Walde (FRG) | 8111 | 10.9 | 7.64 | 15.13 | 2.01 | 49.0 | 14.8 | 43.54 | 4.30 | 71.62 | 4:58.5 |
| 3rd place, bronze medalist(s) | Kurt Bendlin (FRG) | 8064 | 10.7 | 7.56 | 14.74 | 1.80 | 48.3 | 15.0 | 46.78 | 4.60 | 75.42 | 5:09.8 |
| 4 | Mykola Avilov (URS) | 7909 | 10.9 | 7.64 | 13.41 | 2.07 | 49.9 | 14.5 | 46.64 | 4.10 | 60.12 | 5:00.8 |
| 5 | Joachim Kirst (GDR) | 7861 | 10.5 | 7.61 | 16.43 | 1.98 | 50.2 | 15.6 | 46.89 | 4.15 | 57.02 | 5:20.1 |
| 6 | Tom Waddell (USA) | 7719 | 11.3 | 7.47 | 14.45 | 2.01 | 51.2 | 15.3w | 43.73 | 4.50 | 63.70 | 5:04.5 |
| 7 | Rick Sloan (USA) | 7692 | 11.2 | 6.72 | 14.07 | 2.10 | 51.0 | 15.5 | 45.58 | 4.85 | 49.90 | 4:44.0 |
| 8 | Steen Smidt-Jensen (DEN) | 7648 | 10.9 | 7.17 | 13.03 | 1.95 | 50.2 | 14.9 | 41.07 | 4.85 | 46.80 | 4:41.3 |
| 9 | Ed de Noorlander (NED) | 7554 | 11.1 | 6.90 | 13.89 | 1.95 | 50.5 | 14.5w | 41.70 | 4.20 | 50.22 | 4:37.8 |
| 10 | Manfred Tiedtke (GDR) | 7551 | 10.9 | 7.46 | 15.77 | 1.95 | 50.0 | 14.7 | 40.31 | 4.30 | 51.84 | 5:33.4 |
| 11 | Lennart Hedmark (SWE) | 7481 | 11.1 | 7.29 | 14.08 | 1.89 | 51.3 | 14.9 | 42.96 | 4.10 | 62.90 | 5:11.0 |
| 12 | Walter Dießl (AUT) | 7465 | 10.7 | 7.42 | 14.32 | 1.83 | 51.6 | 14.7w | 42.23 | 4.25 | 55.38 | 5:19.7 |
| 13 | Clive Longe (GBR) | 7338 | 10.9 | 6.86 | 15.10 | 1.70 | 49.3 | 15.5 | 47.70 | 4.00 | 59.30 | 5:18.8 |
| 14 | Wu Ah-Min (ROC) | 7209 | 11.3 | 7.40 | 12.08 | 1.80 | 52.2 | 14.8w | 40.25 | 4.35 | 60.10 | 5:08.9 |
| 15 | Spas Dzhurov (BUL) | 7173 | 10.9 | 7.40 | 13.99 | 1.89 | 50.2 | 15.1 | 40.90 | 3.60 | 47.04 | 5:15.5 |
| 16 | Roger Lespagnard (BEL) | 7125 | 11.1 | 6.94 | 12.59 | 1.95 | 50.2 | 15.8 | 37.74 | 4.20 | 47.46 | 4:57.0 |
| 17 | Urs Trautmann (SUI) | 7044 | 11.2 | 6.96 | 15.16 | 1.95 | 1:03.9 | 14.9 | 46.20 | 4.10 | 56.32 | 5:13.6 |
| 18 | Franz Biedermann (LIE) | 6323 | 11.5 | 6.30 | 10.94 | 1.70 | 51.4 | 15.5 | 30.67 | 3.90 | 44.92 | 4:47.9 |
| 19 | Don Vélez (NCA) | 5943 | 11.5 | 6.63 | 10.60 | 1.65 | 53.1 | 16.2 | 36.43 | 3.40 | 48.94 | 5:46.1 |
| —N/a | Jānis Lanka (URS) | DNF (7227) | 10.9 | 7.15 | 15.31 | 1.80 | 49.9 | 14.8w | 49.90 | 3.80 | 59.76 | DNF |
| —N/a | Gert Herunter (AUT) | DNF | 10.5 | 6.75 | 13.93 | 1.83 | 49.7 | 15.0 | 40.38 | | | |
| —N/a | Hansruedi Kunz (SUI) | DNF | 11.0 | 6.54 | 13.67 | 1.65 | 49.1 | 15.7w | 40.18 | | | |
| —N/a | Charlemagne Anyamah (FRA) | DNF | 11.2 | 6.03 | 14.00 | 1.80 | 50.9 | 15.3 | 39.88 | | | |
| —N/a | Roberto Carmona Botella (MEX) | DNF | 10.9 | 6.92 | 14.37 | 1.70 | 50.5 | | | | | |
| —N/a | Valbjörn Þorláksson (ISL) | DNF | 11.1 | 6.76 | 12.59 | 1.70 | 53.2 | | | | | |
| —N/a | Herbert Wessel (GDR) | DNF | 10.8 | 7.39 | 13.70 | 1.86 | 53.4 | | | | | |
| —N/a | Chen Chuan-Show (ROC) | DNF | 10.8 | 6.78 | 12.38 | 1.70 | 50.9 | | | | | |
| —N/a | Rein Aun (URS) | DNF | 10.8 | 7.40 | 14.75 | 1.80 | DNF | | | | | |
| —N/a | Ho Henh Phươc (VIE) | DNF | 11.9 | 6.16 | 11.93 | 1.70 | | | | | | |
| —N/a | Horst Mandl (AUT) | DNF | 11.2 | 7.04 | 13.34 | | | | | | | |
| —N/a | Dominique Rakotorahalahy (MAD) | DNF | 11.5 | 6.62 | | | | | | | | |
| —N/a | Werner von Moltke (FRG) | DNF | 11.1 | 6.14 | | | | | | | | |
| —N/a | Werner Duttweiler (SUI) | DNF | 11.2 | 5.31 | | | | | | | | |
| —N/a | Freddy Herbrand (BEL) | DNS | | | | | | | | | | |
| —N/a | Peter Gabbett (GBR) | DNS | | | | | | | | | | |
