= Kłodzin, West Pomeranian Voivodeship =

Kłodzin
- Settlement
- Location within Poland
- Coordinates: 53°4′37″N 15°35′1″E
- Country: Poland
- Voivodeship: West Pomeranian
- County: Choszczno
- Gmina: Bierzwnik

Kłodzin [ˈkwɔd͡ʑin] (German: Seeberg) is a settlement in the administrative district of Gmina Bierzwnik, within Choszczno County, West Pomeranian Voivodeship, in north-western Poland. It lies approximately 8 km (5 mi) north-west of Bierzwnik, 16 km (10 mi) south-east of Choszczno, and 77 km (48 mi) south-east of the regional capital Szczecin.

For the history of the region, see History of Pomerania.
