= Grzywna =

Grzywna may refer to:

- grzywna (unit), a medieval weight and currency unit
- Grzywna, Kuyavian-Pomeranian Voivodeship, a village in Poland
- Grzywna, West Pomeranian Voivodeship, a hamlet in Poland
