= Strumienno, West Pomeranian Voivodeship =

Strumienno
- Village
- Location within Poland
- Coordinates: 53°2′5″N 15°42′53″E
- Country: Poland
- Voivodeship: West Pomeranian
- County: Choszczno
- Gmina: Bierzwnik

Strumienno [struˈmjɛnnɔ] (German Syringe) is a village in the administrative district of Gmina Bierzwnik, within Choszczno County, West Pomeranian Voivodeship, in north-western Poland. It lies approximately 4 km (2 mi) east of Bierzwnik, 26 km (16 mi) south-east of Choszczno, and 87 km (54 mi) south-east of the regional capital Szczecin.
