= Płoszkowo, Choszczno County =

Płoszkowo
- Village
- Location within Poland
- Coordinates: 53°2′38″N 15°40′10″E
- Country: Poland
- Voivodeship: West Pomeranian
- County: Choszczno
- Gmina: Bierzwnik

Płoszkowo [pwɔʂˈkɔvɔ] (German: Hütte) is a village in the administrative district of Gmina Bierzwnik, within Choszczno County, West Pomeranian Voivodeship, in north-western Poland. It lies approximately 2 km (1 mi) north of Bierzwnik, 23 km (14 mi) south-east of Choszczno, and 84 km (52 mi) south-east of the regional capital Szczecin.

For the history of the region, see History of Pomerania.
