= Kolsk =

- Village
- Location within Poland
- Coordinates: 52°59′22″N 15°37′47″E
- Country: Poland
- Voivodeship: West Pomeranian
- County: Choszczno
- Gmina: Bierzwnik

Kolsk [kɔlsk] (German: Kölzig) is a village in the administrative district of Gmina Bierzwnik, within Choszczno County, West Pomeranian Voivodeship, in north-western Poland. It lies approximately 6 km (4 mi) south-west of Bierzwnik, 25 km (16 mi) south-east of Choszczno, and 85 km (53 mi) south-east of the regional capital Szczecin.

For the history of the region, see History of Pomerania.
