= Górzno, West Pomeranian Voivodeship =

Górzno
- Village
- Location within Poland
- Coordinates: 53°0′5″N 15°35′52″E
- Country: Poland
- Voivodeship: West Pomeranian
- County: Choszczno
- Gmina: Bierzwnik

Górzno [ˈɡuʐnɔ] (formerly German Göhren) is a village in the administrative district of Gmina Bierzwnik, within Choszczno County, West Pomeranian Voivodeship, in north-western Poland. It lies approximately 6 km (4 mi) south-west of Bierzwnik, 23 km (14 mi) south-east of Choszczno, and 82 km (51 mi) south-east of the regional capital Szczecin.

For the history of the region, see History of Pomerania.
