= Bukowie, West Pomeranian Voivodeship =

Bukowie
- Settlement
- Location within Poland
- Coordinates: 53°3′56″N 15°39′28″E
- Country: Poland
- Voivodeship: West Pomeranian
- County: Choszczno
- Gmina: Bierzwnik

Bukowie [buˈkɔvjɛ] is a settlement in the administrative district of Gmina Bierzwnik, within Choszczno County, West Pomeranian Voivodeship, in north-western Poland. It lies approximately 4 km (2 mi) north of Bierzwnik, 21 km (13 mi) south-east of Choszczno, and 82 km (51 mi) south-east of the regional capital Szczecin.

For the history of the region, see History of Pomerania.
