= Dołżyna =

- Settlement
- Location within Poland
- Coordinates: 53°6′21″N 15°44′39″E
- Country: Poland
- Voivodeship: West Pomeranian
- County: Choszczno
- Gmina: Bierzwnik

Dołżyna [dɔu̯ˈʐɨna] (German: Neuhorst) is a settlement in the administrative district of Gmina Bierzwnik, within Choszczno County, West Pomeranian Voivodeship, in north-western Poland. It lies approximately 10 km (6 mi) north-east of Bierzwnik, 24 km (15 mi) east of Choszczno, and 85 km (53 mi) south-east of the regional capital Szczecin.

For the history of the region, see History of Pomerania.
