= Janiszewo =

Janiszewo may refer to the following places:

- Janiszewo, Greater Poland Voivodeship (west-central Poland)
- Janiszewo, Lipno County in Kuyavian-Pomeranian Voivodeship (north-central Poland)
- Janiszewo, Włocławek County in Kuyavian-Pomeranian Voivodeship (central Poland)
- Janiszewo, Pomeranian Voivodeship (north Poland)
- Janiszewo, Warmian-Masurian Voivodeship (north Poland)
