= Athletics at the 1966 British Empire and Commonwealth Games – Men's decathlon =

Men's decathlon at the 1966 British Empire and Commonwealth Games
- Venue: Independence Park, Kingston
- Dates: August 5 and 6, 1966

Medalists
gold medal	Roy Williams	New Zealand
silver medal	Clive Longe	Wales
bronze medal	Gerry Moro	New Zealand

The men's decathlon event at the 1966 British Empire and Commonwealth Games was held on 5 and 6 August at the Independence Park in Kingston, Jamaica. It was the first time that combined events were held at the Games.

== Results ==
† The highest mark recorded in each event is highlighted in yellow and marked with a dagger, †

Full results
Rank	Athlete	Nationality	100m	LJ	SP	HJ	400m	110m H	DT	PV	JT	1500m	Points	Notes
1st place, gold medalist(s)	Roy Williams	New Zealand	11.07	7.24†	13.61	1.85	51.2	15.0†	45.24†	3.80	47.30	4:55.6	7270	
2nd place, silver medalist(s)	Clive Longe	Wales	11.28	6.51	14.86†	1.75	51.5	15.2	42.02	3.60	55.84†	4:38.3	7123	
3rd place, bronze medalist(s)	Gerry Moro	Canada	11.97	6.37	12.75	1.78	52.2	15.4	37.68	4.60	53.94	4:30.6	6983	
4	Norrie Foster	Scotland	11.5	6.79	11.24	1.72	50.5	16.8	35.32	4.15	46.10	4:23.3†	6728	
5	Derek Clarke	England	11.7	6.15	12.86	1.72	52.0	15.4	43.06	3.40	53.24	4:35.0	6691	
6	Keswick Smalling	Jamaica	11.0†	6.59	11.52	1.75	49.0†	15.3	32.28	2.90	50.60	4:54.1	6513	
7	Koech Kiprop	Kenya	11.9	6.24	10.73	1.85	53.5	15.8	32.90	3.80	53.92	4:43.8	6399	
8	Trevor Bickle	Australia	11.76	6.38	9.17	1.67	54.2	15.3	26.44	4.70†	42.42	5:07.2	6007	
9	Dave Gaskin	England	11.5	6.70	10.90	1.88†	52.6	16.8	35.70	3.30	42.22	DNF	5828	
	Ayrton Clouden	Saint Vincent and the Grenadines	11.6	6.31	10.23	1.62	53.3	17.2	26.44	3.30	??.??	DQ	4644	
	Wayne Athorne	Australia	11.46	NM	DNS	–	–	–	–	–	–	–	DNF	

=== Abbreviations in table headings ===
In the order they appear:

- LJ – Long jump
- SP – Shot put
- HJ – High jump
- H – Hurdles
- DT – Discus throw
- PV – Pole vault
- JT – Javelin throw
