= Sojec =

- Settlement
- Location within Poland
- Coordinates: 53°4′9″N 15°38′54″E
- Country: Poland
- Voivodeship: West Pomeranian
- County: Choszczno
- Gmina: Bierzwnik

Sojec [ˈsɔjɛt͡s] (German: Falkenhorst) is a settlement in the administrative district of Gmina Bierzwnik, within Choszczno County, West Pomeranian Voivodeship, in north-western Poland. It lies approximately 5 km (3 mi) north of Bierzwnik, 20 km (12 mi) south-east of Choszczno, and 81 km (50 mi) south-east of the regional capital Szczecin.
