= Pławienko =

- Village
- Location within Poland
- Coordinates: 53°4′0″N 15°37′48″E
- Country: Poland
- Voivodeship: West Pomeranian
- County: Choszczno
- Gmina: Bierzwnik

Pławienko [pwaˈvjɛnkɔ] (German: Neu Plagow) is a village in the administrative district of Gmina Bierzwnik, within Choszczno County, West Pomeranian Voivodeship, in north-western Poland. It lies approximately 5 km (3 mi) north-west of Bierzwnik, 19 km (12 mi) south-east of Choszczno, and 80 km (50 mi) south-east of the regional capital Szczecin.

For the history of the region, see History of Pomerania.
