= Chyże, West Pomeranian Voivodeship =

Chyże
- Settlement
- Location within Poland
- Coordinates: 53°5′13″N 15°48′3″E
- Country: Poland
- Voivodeship: West Pomeranian
- County: Choszczno
- Gmina: Bierzwnik
- Elevation: 75 m (246 ft)
- Population: 24

Chyże [ˈxɨʐɛ] (German: Kietz) is a settlement in the administrative district of Gmina Bierzwnik, within Choszczno County, West Pomeranian Voivodeship, in north-western Poland. It lies approximately 11 km (7 mi) north-east of Bierzwnik, 29 km (18 mi) east of Choszczno, and 89 km (55 mi) south-east of the regional capital Szczecin.

Chyże is a small settlement located in the administrative district of Gmina Bierzwnik, within Choszczno County, in the West Pomeranian Voivodeship of north-western Poland. The settlement lies approximately 11 kilometres north-east of Bierzwnik, about 29 kilometres east of Choszczno, and roughly 89 kilometres south-east of the regional capital Szczecin. Although Chyże is a relatively minor locality with a small population and limited infrastructure, it is situated within a region that has a long and complex historical development shaped by shifting political borders, cultural influences, and demographic changes. Like many small settlements in the Pomeranian region, Chyże reflects the layered history of Central Europe, where Slavic, Germanic, and later Polish influences have interacted over centuries.

The settlement is historically known by the German name Kietz, a term that appeared in several places across Central and Eastern Europe. In medieval German usage, the word “Kietz” often referred to a small settlement or suburb that developed near a fortified town or castle, frequently inhabited by fishermen, craftsmen, or people of lower social status who were not permitted to live inside the main town walls. In some cases, Kietz settlements were inhabited by Slavic populations living alongside German settlers during the medieval eastward expansion known as the Ostsiedlung. The use of the name Kietz for the settlement that is today known as Chyże suggests that it may originally have developed as a small satellite community associated with agricultural or forestry activity in the surrounding area.

The name Chyże itself is believed to derive from a Slavic linguistic root connected to simple rural dwellings or huts. In several Slavic languages, similar words refer to modest wooden houses or farmsteads. This linguistic origin supports the assumption that the settlement likely began as a small rural cluster of households engaged in subsistence farming, animal husbandry, and woodland resource use. The surrounding region historically contained dense forests, wetlands, and scattered agricultural clearings, conditions that often led to the formation of small, dispersed settlements rather than large villages.

Archaeological evidence from the broader Choszczno region suggests that human presence in the area dates back to prehistoric times. Although systematic excavations have not been extensively conducted directly in Chyże itself, nearby areas have yielded artifacts including stone tools, fragments of pottery, and traces of early settlements dating to the Neolithic and Bronze Age periods. These discoveries indicate that the region's forests, lakes, and fertile soils attracted human communities for thousands of years. Early inhabitants likely relied on hunting, fishing, gathering, and primitive agriculture.

During the early medieval period, the area that now includes Chyże was inhabited by West Slavic tribes. These communities were part of a wider network of Slavic settlements spread throughout Pomerania. Their economy was based primarily on agriculture, animal husbandry, fishing, and trade along rivers and forest paths. Settlements were typically small and consisted of wooden houses grouped around cultivated fields and communal areas. Defensive structures such as hillforts existed in some parts of the region, serving as centers of authority and refuge during conflicts.

By the High Middle Ages, the region became incorporated into the Duchy of Pomerania, a political entity ruled by the Griffin dynasty. The duchy experienced periods of independence as well as influence or control from neighboring powers including Poland, the Holy Roman Empire, and later Brandenburg. During this period, the region underwent gradual colonization and agricultural development. German settlers migrated eastward, establishing new villages, reorganizing land ownership, and introducing new legal and administrative systems such as German town law.

As part of these developments, many settlements were renamed or newly established under German linguistic forms. The name Kietz became associated with the small community that eventually developed into present-day Chyże. Historical records from surrounding settlements indicate that rural communities in the region were typically composed of several farms, barns, and storage buildings, often accompanied by a small chapel or parish church located in a nearby village.

Throughout the late medieval and early modern periods, the region remained primarily agricultural and sparsely populated. Local inhabitants cultivated grains such as rye, barley, and oats, which were suited to the sandy soils of Pomerania. Livestock farming also played an important role, particularly cattle and pigs. Forestry was another significant economic activity, as the vast woodlands of the region provided timber for construction, firewood, and charcoal production.

During the seventeenth century, the wider Pomeranian region experienced significant disruptions caused by the Thirty Years' War. Armies moving across Central Europe brought destruction, disease, and population decline to many rural areas. Although specific documentation about Chyże during this period is limited, it is likely that small settlements in the area were affected by troop movements, requisitions of food and livestock, and temporary abandonment of farmland.

Following the Peace of Westphalia in 1648, parts of Pomerania came under Swedish control, while other areas remained under Brandenburg-Prussian administration. Over time, Brandenburg-Prussia consolidated its authority over the region. Under Prussian rule, administrative reforms were introduced, including systematic land surveys, improved taxation systems, and the recording of population statistics. Small settlements such as Kietz continued to exist as minor agricultural communities within the broader rural economy.

The nineteenth century brought gradual modernization to the region. Agricultural reforms introduced new crop rotations, improved tools, and better land management practices. The abolition of certain feudal obligations allowed farmers greater control over their land, although economic conditions remained challenging for many rural inhabitants. Population growth during this period led to the expansion of farmland and occasional establishment of additional farmsteads around existing settlements.

Industrialization had a limited direct effect on small communities like Chyże. Major industrial centers developed elsewhere in Pomerania and neighboring regions, particularly in larger towns connected by railways and waterways. However, infrastructure improvements such as roads and railway lines built in the wider area improved communication and trade. Farmers were increasingly able to transport their produce to regional markets in towns such as Choszczno and other urban centers.

During the early twentieth century, the region remained part of the German state. Many inhabitants of rural communities were engaged in agriculture or forestry, and daily life followed a seasonal rhythm shaped by planting, harvesting, and livestock care. The First World War affected the population through military conscription and economic shortages, although the region itself was far from the main battlefields.

The most dramatic changes occurred during and after the Second World War. As the war drew to a close in 1945, Soviet forces advanced through Pomerania during the final stages of the conflict on the Eastern Front. The region experienced significant upheaval, including the flight or expulsion of much of the German population. Following the Potsdam Agreement, the borders of Poland were shifted westward, and territories east of the Oder–Neisse line, including the area around Chyże, were transferred to Polish administration.

After the war, the settlement was renamed Chyże and repopulated largely by Polish settlers, many of whom had been displaced from territories that were annexed by the Soviet Union in eastern Poland. These demographic changes dramatically altered the cultural and linguistic composition of the region. New inhabitants often had to rebuild farms, repair damaged buildings, and adapt to unfamiliar landscapes and local conditions.

During the communist period in Poland, rural areas underwent agricultural restructuring. In some places, state farms were established, while in others private smallholdings remained dominant. Rural populations gradually declined as younger generations moved to cities in search of employment, education, and improved living conditions. As a result, many small settlements experienced population decline and aging demographics.

The natural environment surrounding Chyże is characteristic of the West Pomeranian landscape. The area is composed of gently rolling terrain formed during the last glacial period. Numerous lakes, rivers, and wetlands are scattered throughout the region, while forests cover significant portions of the land. The forests are dominated by pine, spruce, and birch, with occasional oak and beech stands.

Wildlife in the region includes species typical of northern European forest ecosystems. Deer, wild boar, foxes, and hares are commonly found in surrounding woodlands, while various bird species inhabit the forests, lakes, and agricultural fields. The natural environment plays an important role in local biodiversity and contributes to the ecological value of the region.

The climate of the area is classified as temperate, influenced both by continental weather patterns from eastern Europe and maritime influences from the Baltic Sea. Winters are generally cool but not extremely severe, while summers are moderate with occasional warm periods. Seasonal precipitation supports agriculture and forest growth.

In the present day, Chyże remains a small and quiet rural settlement with limited infrastructure. Its residents typically rely on nearby towns for services such as education, healthcare, and commerce. Agriculture continues to play a role in the local economy, although many inhabitants commute to work in surrounding villages or towns.

Despite its small size, the settlement forms part of the broader historical and cultural landscape of West Pomerania. The region's history reflects centuries of shifting borders, population movements, and cultural interactions. From its probable origins as a small rural hamlet during the medieval period to its modern status as a Polish settlement in the West Pomeranian Voivodeship, Chyże represents one of many local communities that illustrate the complex historical development of Central European border regions.

Główny Urząd Statystyczny (Central Statistical Office). National Register of Territorial Land Apportionment Journal (TERYT). Available through the SIMC database for localities in Poland.

For the history of the region, see History of Pomerania.
