= Przykuna =

- Settlement
- Location within Poland
- Coordinates: 53°3′2″N 15°36′20″E
- Country: Poland
- Voivodeship: West Pomeranian
- County: Choszczno
- Gmina: Bierzwnik

Przykuna [pʂɨˈkuna] (German: Buchwald) is a settlement in the administrative district of Gmina Bierzwnik, within Choszczno County, West Pomeranian Voivodeship, in north-western Poland. It lies approximately 5 km (3 mi) north-west of Bierzwnik, 19 km (12 mi) south-east of Choszczno, and 80 km (50 mi) south-east of the regional capital Szczecin.

For the history of the region, see History of Pomerania.
