= Gajno =

- Settlement
- Location within Poland
- Coordinates: 53°3′21″N 15°43′58″E
- Country: Poland
- Voivodeship: West Pomeranian
- County: Choszczno
- Gmina: Bierzwnik

Gajno [ˈɡai̯nɔ] (German: Hermannsruh) is a settlement in the administrative district of Gmina Bierzwnik, within Choszczno County, West Pomeranian Voivodeship, in north-western Poland. It lies approximately 6 km (4 mi) north-east of Bierzwnik, 26 km (16 mi) south-east of Choszczno, and 87 km (54 mi) south-east of the regional capital Szczecin.

For the history of the region, see History of Pomerania.
