= Krzywin (disambiguation) =

Krzywin may refer to the following places in Poland:

- Krzywiń, a town in west-central Poland
- Krzywin, Choszczno County
- Krzywin, Gryfino County
