= Łasko =

- Village
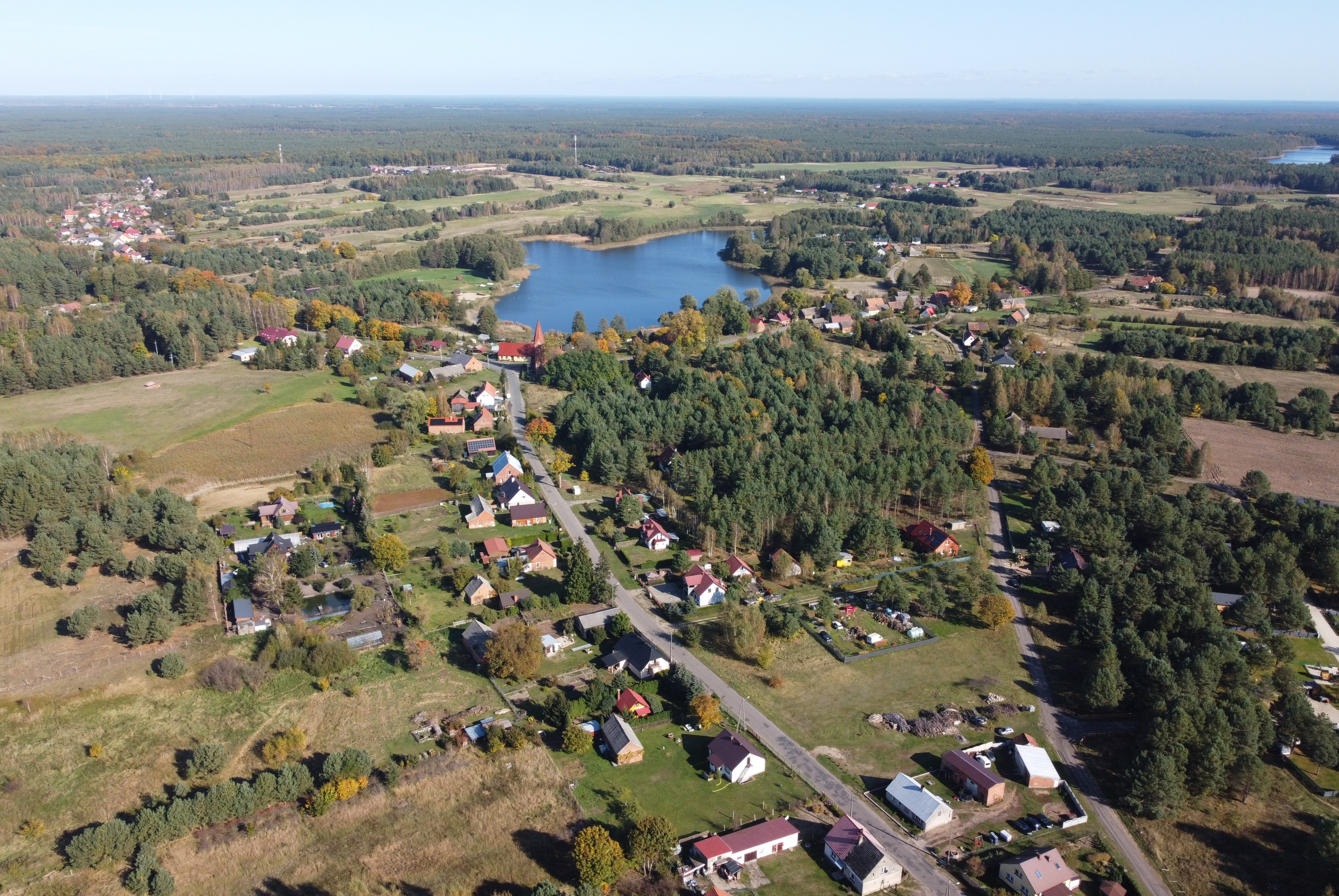

- Location within Poland
- Coordinates: 53°4′28″N 15°46′43″E
- Country: Poland
- Voivodeship: West Pomeranian
- County: Choszczno
- Gmina: Bierzwnik

Łasko [ˈwaskɔ] (formerly German Althütte) is a village in the administrative district of Gmina Bierzwnik, within Choszczno County, West Pomeranian Voivodeship, in north-western Poland. It lies approximately 9 km (6 mi) north-east of Bierzwnik, 28 km (17 mi) east of Choszczno, and 89 km (55 mi) south-east of the regional capital Szczecin.

For the history of the region, see History of Pomerania.
