= Trzebicz, West Pomeranian Voivodeship =

Trzebicz
- Settlement
- Location within Poland
- Coordinates: 53°3′32″N 15°41′55″E
- Country: Poland
- Voivodeship: West Pomeranian
- County: Choszczno
- Gmina: Bierzwnik

Trzebicz [ˈtʂɛbit͡ʂ] (German Rohrbruch) is a settlement in the administrative district of Gmina Bierzwnik, within Choszczno County, West Pomeranian Voivodeship, in north-western Poland. It lies approximately 4 km (2 mi) north-east of Bierzwnik, 24 km (15 mi) south-east of Choszczno, and 85 km (53 mi) south-east of the regional capital Szczecin.

For the history of the region, see History of Pomerania.
