= Zdrójno, West Pomeranian Voivodeship =

Zdrójno
- Village
- Location within Poland
- Coordinates: 53°7′14″N 15°37′11″E
- Country: Poland
- Voivodeship: West Pomeranian
- County: Choszczno
- Gmina: Bierzwnik

Zdrójno [ˈzdrui̯nɔ] (German: Adolfsau) is a village in the administrative district of Gmina Bierzwnik, within Choszczno County, West Pomeranian Voivodeship, in north-western Poland. It lies approximately 11 km (7 mi) north of Bierzwnik, 16 km (10 mi) east of Choszczno, and 77 km (48 mi) south-east of the regional capital Szczecin.
