= Kunica =

- Settlement
- Location within Poland
- Coordinates: 53°3′40″N 15°42′45″E
- Country: Poland
- Voivodeship: West Pomeranian
- County: Choszczno
- Gmina: Bierzwnik

Kunica [kuˈnit͡sa] (German: Sauenwerder) is a settlement in the administrative district of Gmina Bierzwnik, within Choszczno County, West Pomeranian Voivodeship, in north-western Poland. It lies approximately 5 km (3 mi) north-east of Bierzwnik, 24 km (15 mi) south-east of Choszczno, and 85 km (53 mi) south-east of the regional capital Szczecin.

For the history of the region, see History of Pomerania.
