= Klasztorne, Choszczno County =

Klasztorne
- Village
- Location within Poland
- Coordinates: 53°0′59″N 15°44′18″E
- Country: Poland
- Voivodeship: West Pomeranian
- County: Choszczno
- Gmina: Bierzwnik

Klasztorne [klaʂˈtɔrnɛ] (German: Klosterfelde) is a village in the administrative district of Gmina Bierzwnik, within Choszczno County, West Pomeranian Voivodeship, in north-western Poland. It lies approximately 6 km (4 mi) east of Bierzwnik, 29 km (18 mi) south-east of Choszczno, and 89 km (55 mi) south-east of the regional capital Szczecin.

For the history of the region, see History of Pomerania.
