= Zgorzel, West Pomeranian Voivodeship =

Zgorzel
- Village
- Location within Poland
- Coordinates: 53°6′47″N 15°43′56″E
- Country: Poland
- Voivodeship: West Pomeranian
- County: Choszczno
- Gmina: Bierzwnik

Zgorzel [ˈzɡɔʐɛl] is a village in the administrative district of Gmina Bierzwnik, within Choszczno County, West Pomeranian Voivodeship, in north-western Poland. It lies approximately 10 km (6 mi) north-east of Bierzwnik, 23 km (14 mi) east of Choszczno, and 84 km (52 mi) south-east of the regional capital Szczecin.

For the history of the region, see History of Pomerania.
