= Kosinek =

- Settlement
- Location within Poland
- Coordinates: 53°4′10″N 15°34′57″E
- Country: Poland
- Voivodeship: West Pomeranian
- County: Choszczno
- Gmina: Bierzwnik

Kosinek [kɔˈɕinɛk] (German: Augustenruh) is a settlement in the administrative district of Gmina Bierzwnik, within Choszczno County, West Pomeranian Voivodeship, in north-western Poland. It lies approximately 7 km (4 mi) north-west of Bierzwnik, 17 km (11 mi) south-east of Choszczno, and 77 km (48 mi) south-east of the regional capital Szczecin.

For the history of the region, see History of Pomerania.
