= Malczewo, West Pomeranian Voivodeship =

Malczewo
- Village
- Location within Poland
- Coordinates: 53°5′31″N 15°38′1″E
- Country: Poland
- Voivodeship: West Pomeranian
- County: Choszczno
- Gmina: Bierzwnik

Malczewo [malˈt͡ʂɛvɔ] (German: Rehfelde) is a village in the administrative district of Gmina Bierzwnik, within Choszczno County, West Pomeranian Voivodeship, in north-western Poland. It lies approximately 7 km (4 mi) north of Bierzwnik, 18 km (11 mi) south-east of Choszczno, and 79 km (49 mi) south-east of the regional capital Szczecin.

For the history of the region, see History of Pomerania.
