= Starzyce, Choszczno County =

Starzyce
- Village
- Location within Poland
- Coordinates: 53°2′29″N 15°38′46″E
- Country: Poland
- Voivodeship: West Pomeranian
- County: Choszczno
- Gmina: Bierzwnik

Starzyce [staˈʐɨt͡sɛ] (German Reierort) is a village in the administrative district of Gmina Bierzwnik, within Choszczno County, West Pomeranian Voivodeship, in north-western Poland. It lies approximately 2 km (1 mi) north-west of Bierzwnik, 22 km (14 mi) south-east of Choszczno, and 83 km (52 mi) south-east of the regional capital Szczecin.
