= Piaseczno, Choszczno County =

Piaseczno
- Settlement
- Location within Poland
- Coordinates: 53°7′0″N 15°48′39″E
- Country: Poland
- Voivodeship: West Pomeranian
- County: Choszczno
- Gmina: Bierzwnik

Piaseczno [pjaˈsɛt͡ʂnɔ] (German: Pätznickerie) is a settlement in the administrative district of Gmina Bierzwnik, within Choszczno County, West Pomeranian Voivodeship, in north-western Poland. It lies approximately 14 km (9 mi) north-east of Bierzwnik, 28 km (17 mi) east of Choszczno, and 89 km (55 mi) east of the regional capital Szczecin.

For the history of the region, see History of Pomerania.
