= Chełmienko =

Administrative district in Poland

- Settlement
- Location within Poland
- Coordinates: 53°1′36″N 15°33′52″E
- Country: Poland
- Voivodeship: West Pomeranian
- County: Choszczno
- Gmina: Bierzwnik

Chełmienko [xɛu̯ˈmjɛnkɔ] is a settlement in the administrative district of Gmina Bierzwnik, within Choszczno County, West Pomeranian Voivodeship, in north-western Poland. It lies approximately 7 km (4 mi) west of Bierzwnik, 20 km (12 mi) south-east of Choszczno, and 79 km (49 mi) south-east of the regional capital Szczecin.
