= Budzice =

- Settlement
- Location within Poland
- Coordinates: 53°3′15″N 15°41′39″E
- Country: Poland
- Voivodeship: West Pomeranian
- County: Choszczno
- Gmina: Bierzwnik

Budzice [buˈd͡ʑit͡sɛ] is a settlement in the administrative district of Gmina Bierzwnik, within Choszczno County, West Pomeranian Voivodeship, in north-western Poland. It lies approximately 3 km (2 mi) north-east of Bierzwnik, 24 km (15 mi) south-east of Choszczno, and 85 km (53 mi) south-east of the regional capital Szczecin.
