= Jaglisko =

- Village
- Location within Poland
- Coordinates: 53°1′17″N 15°41′55″E
- Country: Poland
- Voivodeship: West Pomeranian
- County: Choszczno
- Gmina: Bierzwnik
- Population: 210

Jaglisko [jaˈɡliskɔ] (formerly German Diebelbruch) is a village in the administrative district of Gmina Bierzwnik, within Choszczno County, West Pomeranian Voivodeship, in north-western Poland. It lies approximately 3 km (2 mi) south-east of Bierzwnik, 26 km (16 mi) south-east of Choszczno, and 87 km (54 mi) south-east of the regional capital Szczecin. The village has a population of 210.

For the history of the region, see History of Pomerania.
