= Kołecko =

- Settlement
- Location within Poland
- Coordinates: 53°0′34″N 15°37′26″E
- Country: Poland
- Voivodeship: West Pomeranian
- County: Choszczno
- Gmina: Bierzwnik

Kołecko [kɔˈwɛt͡skɔ] (German: Kölzigerberg) is a settlement in the administrative district of Gmina Bierzwnik, within Choszczno County, West Pomeranian Voivodeship, in north-western Poland. It lies approximately 4 km (2 mi) south-west of Bierzwnik, 23 km (14 mi) south-east of Choszczno, and 83 km (52 mi) south-east of the regional capital Szczecin.

For the history of the region, see History of Pomerania.
