= Noorlander =

Noorlander or de Noorlander is a Dutch toponymic surname. Notable people with the surname include:

- Ed de Noorlander (born 1945), Dutch decathlete
- Seda Noorlander (born 1974), Dutch tennis player
