= Zieleniewo, Choszczno County =

Zieleniewo
- Village
- Location within Poland
- Coordinates: 53°6′N 15°40′E
- Country: Poland
- Voivodeship: West Pomeranian
- County: Choszczno
- Gmina: Bierzwnik

Zieleniewo [ʑɛlɛˈɲɛvɔ] (German: Sellnow) is a village in the administrative district of Gmina Bierzwnik, within Choszczno County, West Pomeranian Voivodeship, in north-western Poland. It lies approximately 8 km (5 mi) north of Bierzwnik, 20 km (12 mi) south-east of Choszczno, and 81 km (50 mi) south-east of the regional capital Szczecin.

== Notable residents ==
- Günter Lörke (born 1935), German cyclist
