= Antoniewko =

- Settlement
- Location within Poland
- Coordinates: 53°5′41″N 15°46′5″E
- Country: Poland
- Voivodeship: West Pomeranian
- County: Choszczno
- Gmina: Bierzwnik

Antoniewko [antɔˈɲɛfkɔ] is a settlement in the administrative district of Gmina Bierzwnik, within Choszczno County, West Pomeranian Voivodeship, in north-western Poland. It lies approximately 10 km (6 mi) north-east of Bierzwnik, 26 km (16 mi) east of Choszczno, and 87 km (54 mi) south-east of the regional capital Szczecin.
