= Bożejewko =

- Village
- Location within Poland
- Coordinates: 53°1′N 15°34′E
- Country: Poland
- Voivodeship: West Pomeranian
- County: Choszczno
- Gmina: Bierzwnik

Bożejewko [bɔʐɛˈjɛfkɔ] is a village in the administrative district of Gmina Bierzwnik, within Choszczno County, West Pomeranian Voivodeship, in north-western Poland. It lies approximately 7 km (4 mi) west of Bierzwnik, 21 km (13 mi) south-east of Choszczno, and 80 km (50 mi) south-east of the regional capital Szczecin.
