= Kurt Bendlin =

German athletics competitor (1943–2024)

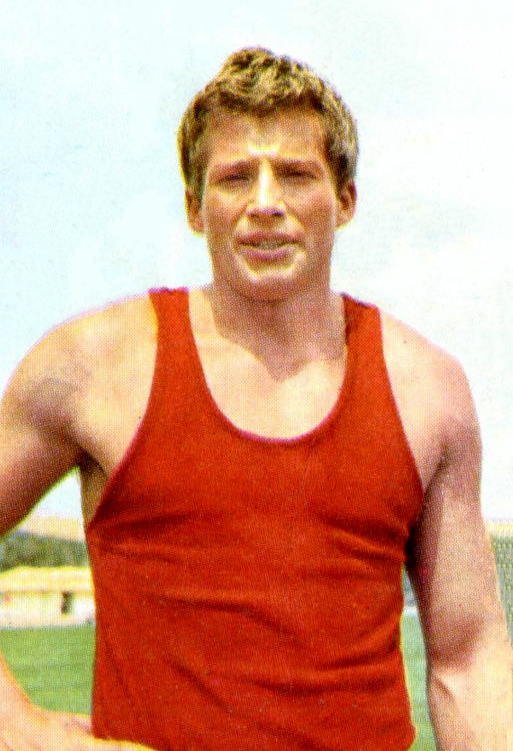
- Bendlin in 1968

Personal information
- Born: 22 May 1943 Maßort, Reichsgau Danzig-West Prussia, Germany (now Stalmierz, Poland)
- Died: 29 August 2024 (aged 81) Paderborn, North Rhine-Westphalia, Germany
- Height: 1.78 m (5 ft 10 in)
- Weight: 91 kg (201 lb)

Sport
- Sport: Athletics
- Event: Decathlon
- Club: Bayer Leverkusen

Achievements and titles
- Personal best: 8234 (1967)
Medal record
Representing West Germany
Olympic Games
Bronze medal – third place	1968 Mexico City	Decathlon

Kurt Bendlin (German pronunciation: [kʊʁt bɛntˈliːn]; 22 May 1943 – 29 August 2024) was a West German decathlete. In 1967 he became the first German to set a world decathlon record in 34 years; he was voted German Sportsman of the Year, received the Silbernes Lorbeerblatt, and was cast in bronze by Arno Breker. Next year he won a bronze medal at the 1968 Summer Olympics in Mexico City.

Bendlin won national decathlon titles in 1965, 1967, 1971, and 1974. He studied Physical Education at the German Sport University Cologne after his diploma he worked as a teacher of physical education. From 1979 to 2000 he was Head of company Sports of the Nixdorf Computer company. After 2000 he organized outdoor camps and training courses for managers, and in 1986 published a related book Fitness für Manager.

Bendlin died on 29 August 2024, at the age of 81.

Awards
Preceded by (Germany) Rudi Altig	German Sportsman of the Year; 1967	Succeeded by (Germany) Franz Keller
Records
Preceded by (United States) Russ Hodge	Men's decathlon world record holder 14 May 1967 – 11 December 1969	Succeeded by (United States) Bill Toomey
