= Czapliska =

- Settlement
- Location within Poland
- Coordinates: 53°5′18″N 15°42′53″E
- Country: Poland
- Voivodeship: West Pomeranian
- County: Choszczno
- Gmina: Bierzwnik

Czapliska [t͡ʂaˈpliska] (German: Wasserfelde) is a settlement in the administrative district of Gmina Bierzwnik, within Choszczno County, West Pomeranian Voivodeship, in north-western Poland. It lies approximately 7 km (4 mi) north-east of Bierzwnik, 23 km (14 mi) south-east of Choszczno, and 84 km (52 mi) south-east of the regional capital Szczecin.

For the history of the region, see History of Pomerania.
