= Ostromęcko =

- Village
- Location within Poland
- Coordinates: 53°0′35″N 15°37′59″E
- Country: Poland
- Voivodeship: West Pomeranian
- County: Choszczno
- Gmina: Bierzwnik

Ostromęcko [ɔstrɔˈmɛnt͡skɔ] (German: Reichssiedlung Kölzig) is a village in the administrative district of Gmina Bierzwnik, within Choszczno County, West Pomeranian Voivodeship, in north-western Poland. It lies approximately 4 km (2 mi) south-west of Bierzwnik, 24 km (15 mi) south-east of Choszczno, and 84 km (52 mi) south-east of the regional capital Szczecin.

For the history of the region, see History of Pomerania.
