= Rębusz =

- Village
- Location within Poland
- Coordinates: 53°3′N 15°35′E
- Country: Poland
- Voivodeship: West Pomeranian
- County: Choszczno
- Gmina: Bierzwnik
- Population (approx.): 80

Rębusz [ˈrɛmbuʂ] (German: Augustwalde) is a village in the administrative district of Gmina Bierzwnik, within Choszczno County, West Pomeranian Voivodeship, in north-western Poland. It lies approximately 6 km (4 mi) west of Bierzwnik, 18 km (11 mi) south-east of Choszczno, and 79 km (49 mi) south-east of the regional capital Szczecin.

For the history of the region, see History of Pomerania.

The village has an approximate population of 80.
