= Przeczno, West Pomeranian Voivodeship =

Przeczno
- Village
- Location within Poland
- Coordinates: 53°2′43″N 15°42′52″E
- Country: Poland
- Voivodeship: West Pomeranian
- County: Choszczno
- Gmina: Bierzwnik

Przeczno [ˈpʂɛt͡ʂnɔ] (German: Hagelfelde) is a village in the administrative district of Gmina Bierzwnik, within Choszczno County, West Pomeranian Voivodeship, in north-western Poland. It lies approximately 4 km (2 mi) north-east of Bierzwnik, 25 km (16 mi) south-east of Choszczno, and 86 km (53 mi) south-east of the regional capital Szczecin.

For the history of the region, see History of Pomerania.
