= Wygon, West Pomeranian Voivodeship =

Wygon
- Village
- Location within Poland
- Coordinates: 53°5′N 15°47′E
- Country: Poland
- Voivodeship: West Pomeranian
- County: Choszczno
- Gmina: Bierzwnik
- Population (approx.): 300

Wygon [ˈvɨɡɔn] (German: Langenfuhr) is a village in the administrative district of Gmina Bierzwnik, within Choszczno County, West Pomeranian Voivodeship, in north-western Poland. It lies approximately 10 km (6 mi) north-east of Bierzwnik, 28 km (17 mi) east of Choszczno, and 89 km (55 mi) south-east of the regional capital Szczecin.

The village has an approximate population of 300.
