= Pławno =

Pławno may refer to the following villages in Poland:

- Pławno, Łódź Voivodeship (central Poland)
- Pławno, Greater Poland Voivodeship (west-central Poland)
- Pławno, Choszczno County in West Pomeranian Voivodeship (north-west Poland)
