= Gmina Chrostkowo =

Gmina Chrostkowo Chrostkowo Commune
- Gmina
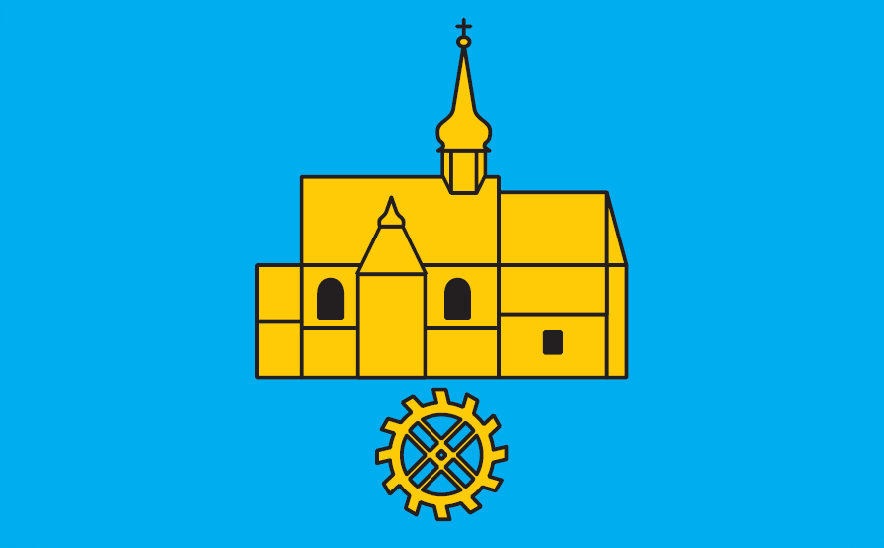
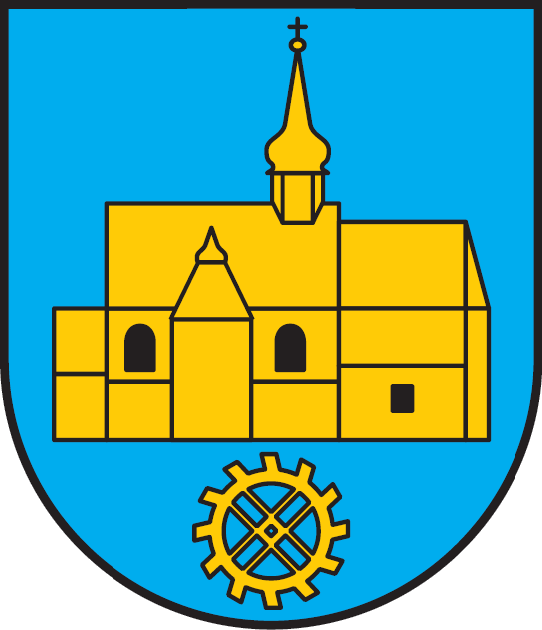
- Flag Coat of arms
- Interactive map of Gmina Chrostkowo
- Coordinates (Chrostkowo): 52°57′N 19°15′E
- Country: Poland
- Voivodeship: Kuyavian-Pomeranian
- County: Lipno
- Seat: Chrostkowo

Area
  - Total: 74.08 km^{2} (28.60 sq mi)

Population (2006)
  - Total: 3,110
  - Density: 42.0/km^{2} (109/sq mi)
- Website: http://www.chrostkowo.bazagmin.pl/

Gmina Chrostkowo is a rural gmina (administrative district) in Lipno County, Kuyavian-Pomeranian Voivodeship, in north-central Poland. Its seat is the village of Chrostkowo, which lies approximately 13 kilometres (8 mi) north-east of Lipno and 44 km (27 mi) east of Toruń.

The gmina covers an area of 74.08 square kilometres (28.6 sq mi), and as of 2006 its total population is 3,110.

== Villages ==
Gmina Chrostkowo contains the villages and settlements of Adamowo, Chojno, Chrostkowo, Głęboczek, Gołuchowo, Janiszewo, Kawno, Ksawery, Lubianki, Majdany, Makowiec, Nowa Wieś, Nowe Chrostkowo, Sikórz, Stalmierz and Wildno.

== Neighbouring gminas ==
Gmina Chrostkowo is bordered by the gminas of Brzuze, Kikół, Lipno, Rogowo, Skępe and Zbójno.
