= Chrostkowo =

- Village
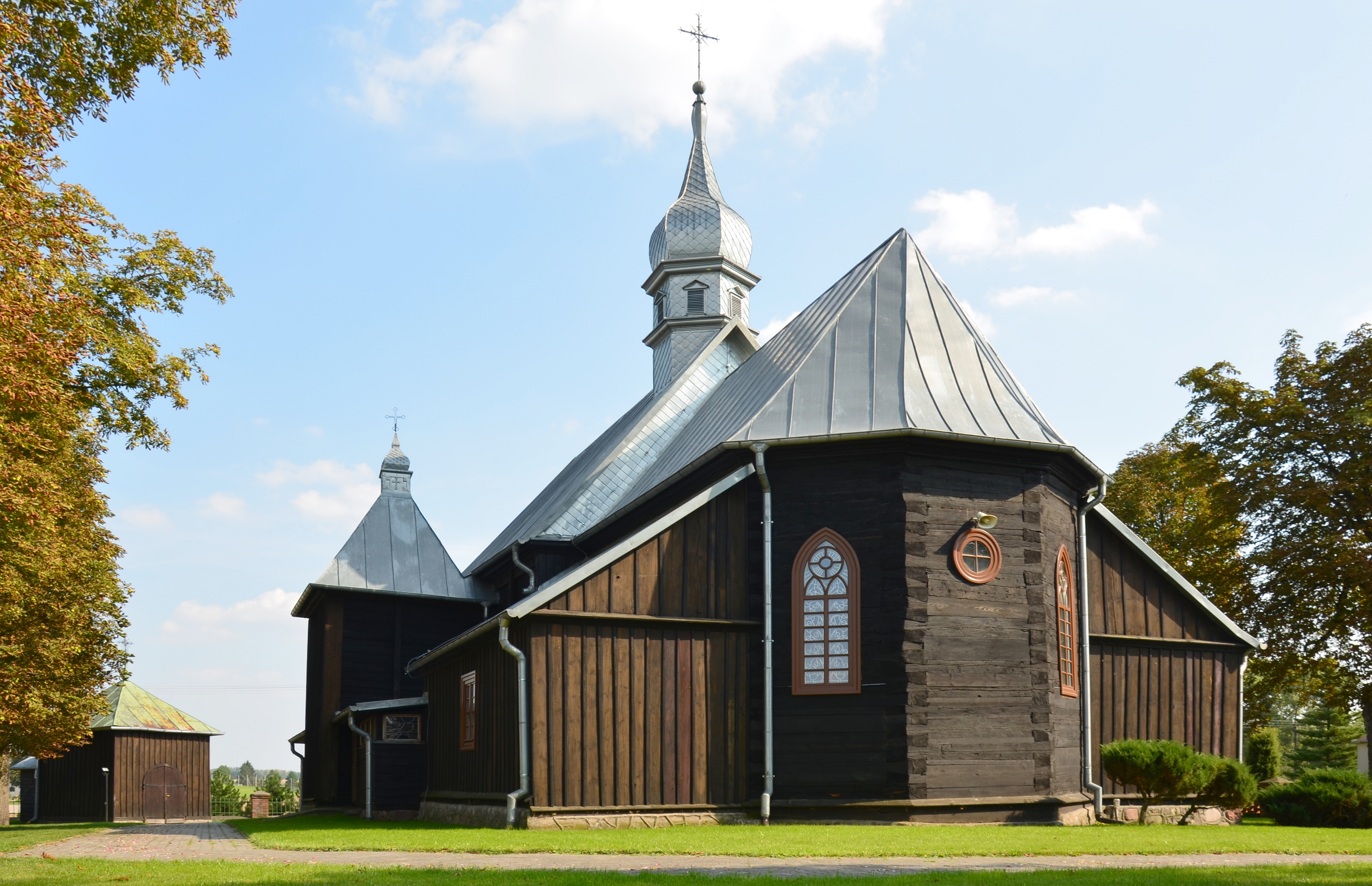
- Church of Saint Barbara

- Location within Poland
- Coordinates: 52°57′N 19°15′E
- Country: Poland
- Voivodeship: Kuyavian-Pomeranian
- County: Lipno
- Gmina: Chrostkowo

Chrostkowo [xrɔstˈkɔvɔ] is a village in Lipno County, Kuyavian-Pomeranian Voivodeship, in north-central Poland. It is the seat of the gmina (administrative district) called Gmina Chrostkowo.
