= Gmina Bierzwnik =

Gmina Bierzwnik Bierzwnik Commune
- Gmina
- Coat of arms
- Interactive map of Gmina Bierzwnik
- Coordinates (Bierzwnik): 53°2′N 15°40′E
- Country: Poland
- Voivodeship: West Pomeranian
- County: Choszczno
- Seat: Bierzwnik

Area
  - Total: 238.92 km^{2} (92.25 sq mi)

Population (2006)
  - Total: 4,813
  - Density: 20.14/km^{2} (52.17/sq mi)
- Website: http://www.bierzwnik.pl/

Gmina Bierzwnik is a rural gmina (administrative district) in Choszczno County, West Pomeranian Voivodeship, in north-western Poland. Its seat is the village of Bierzwnik, which lies approximately 24 kilometres (15 mi) south-east of Choszczno and 84 km (52 mi) south-east of the regional capital Szczecin.

The gmina covers an area of 238.92 square kilometres (92.2 sq mi), and as of 2006 has a population of 4,813.

== Villages ==
Gmina Bierzwnik contains the villages and settlements of Antoniewko, Bierzwnik, Bożejewko, Breń, Budzice, Bukowie, Chełmienko, Chyże, Czapliska, Dołżyna, Gajno, Górzno, Grzywna, Jaglisko, Kawno, Klasztorne, Kłodzin, Kołecko, Kolsk, Kosinek, Kruczaj, Krzywin, Kunica, Łasko, Malczewo, Ostromęcko, Piaseczno, Pławienko, Pławno, Płoszkowo, Przeczno, Przykuna, Rębusz, Smędowa, Sojec, Starzyce, Strumienno, Trzebicz, Wygon, Zdrójno, Zgorzel and Zieleniewo.

== Neighbouring gminas ==
Gmina Bierzwnik is bordered by the gminas of Choszczno, Dobiegniew, Drawno, Krzęcin and Strzelce Krajeńskie.
