= Koech Kiprop =

Kenyan decathlete

Personal information
- Nationality: Kenyan
- Born: 1938 (age 86–87)

Sport
- Sport: Athletics
- Event: Decathlon

Koech Kiprop (born 1938) is a Kenyan athlete. He competed in the men's decathlon at the 1964 Summer Olympics held in Tokyo, Japan. In 1966, he competed in the men's decathlon at the 1966 British Empire and Commonwealth Games held in Kingston, Jamaica.
