= Grzywna, West Pomeranian Voivodeship =

Grzywna
- Settlement
- Location within Poland
- Coordinates: 53°3′5″N 15°35′37″E
- Country: Poland
- Voivodeship: West Pomeranian
- County: Choszczno
- Gmina: Bierzwnik

Grzywna [ˈɡʐɨvna] (German: Waidmannsruh) is a settlement in the administrative district of Gmina Bierzwnik, within Choszczno County, West Pomeranian Voivodeship, in north-western Poland. It lies approximately 6 km (4 mi) west of Bierzwnik, 19 km (12 mi) south-east of Choszczno, and 79 km (49 mi) south-east of the regional capital Szczecin.

For the history of the region, see History of Pomerania.
