= Horst Beyer (decathlete) =

German decathlete

Medal record

Men's athletics

Representing West Germany

European Championships
Bronze medal – third place	1966 Budapest	Decathlon

Horst Beyer (5 January 1940 – 9 December 2017) was a German decathlete who competed at the 1964 and 1972 Summer Olympics. In 1966, he earned a bronze medal at the European Athletics Championships. Beyer died at the age of 77 in 2017, at a hospital in Hamburg. Beyer was an honorary member of VfL Wolfsburg. During his active time as an athlete, he also started for Hamburger SV and USC Mainz.
