= Herbert Wessel =

German decathlete

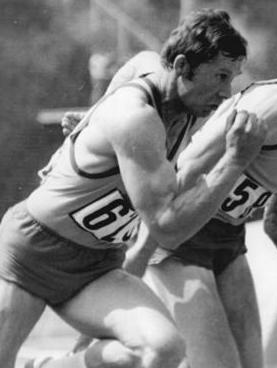
- Herbert Wessel in 1971

Personal information
- Nationality: German
- Born: 12 March 1943 (age 83) Königsberg, East Prussia, Germany (Kaliningrad, Russia)

Sport
- Sport: Athletics
- Event: Decathlon
Medal record
Men's athletics
Representing East Germany
European Championships
Silver medal – second place	1969 Athens	Decathlon

Herbert Wessel (born 12 March 1943) is a German athlete. He competed in the men's decathlon at the 1968 Summer Olympics.
