= Athletics at the 1966 British Empire and Commonwealth Games – Men's pole vault =

Men's pole vault at the 1966 British Empire and Commonwealth Games
- Venue: Independence Park, Kingston
- Dates: August 13, 1966

Medalists
gold medal	Trevor Bickle	Australia
silver medal	Mike Bull	Northern Ireland
bronze medal	Gerry Moro	Canada

The men's pole vault event at the 1966 British Empire and Commonwealth Games was held on 13 August at the Independence Park in Kingston, Jamaica.

== Results ==
Results
Rank	Name	Nationality	Result	Notes
1st place, gold medalist(s)	Trevor Bickle	Australia	15 ft 9 in (4.80 m)	
2nd place, silver medalist(s)	Mike Bull	Northern Ireland	15 ft 6 in (4.72 m)	
3rd place, bronze medalist(s)	Gerry Moro	Canada	15 ft 3 in (4.65 m)	
4	Dave Stevenson	Scotland	15 ft 3 in (4.65 m)	
5	Robert Yard	Canada	15 ft 0 in (4.57 m)	
6	Trevor Burton	England	13 ft 6 in (4.11 m)	
7	Norrie Foster	Scotland	13 ft 6 in (4.11 m)	
8	Augustine Soga	Ghana	12 ft 6 in (3.81 m)	
	James Filshie	Australia	DNS	
	Ayrton Clouden	Saint Vincent and the Grenadines	DNS	
