= Adamowo, Lipno County =

Adamowo
- Village
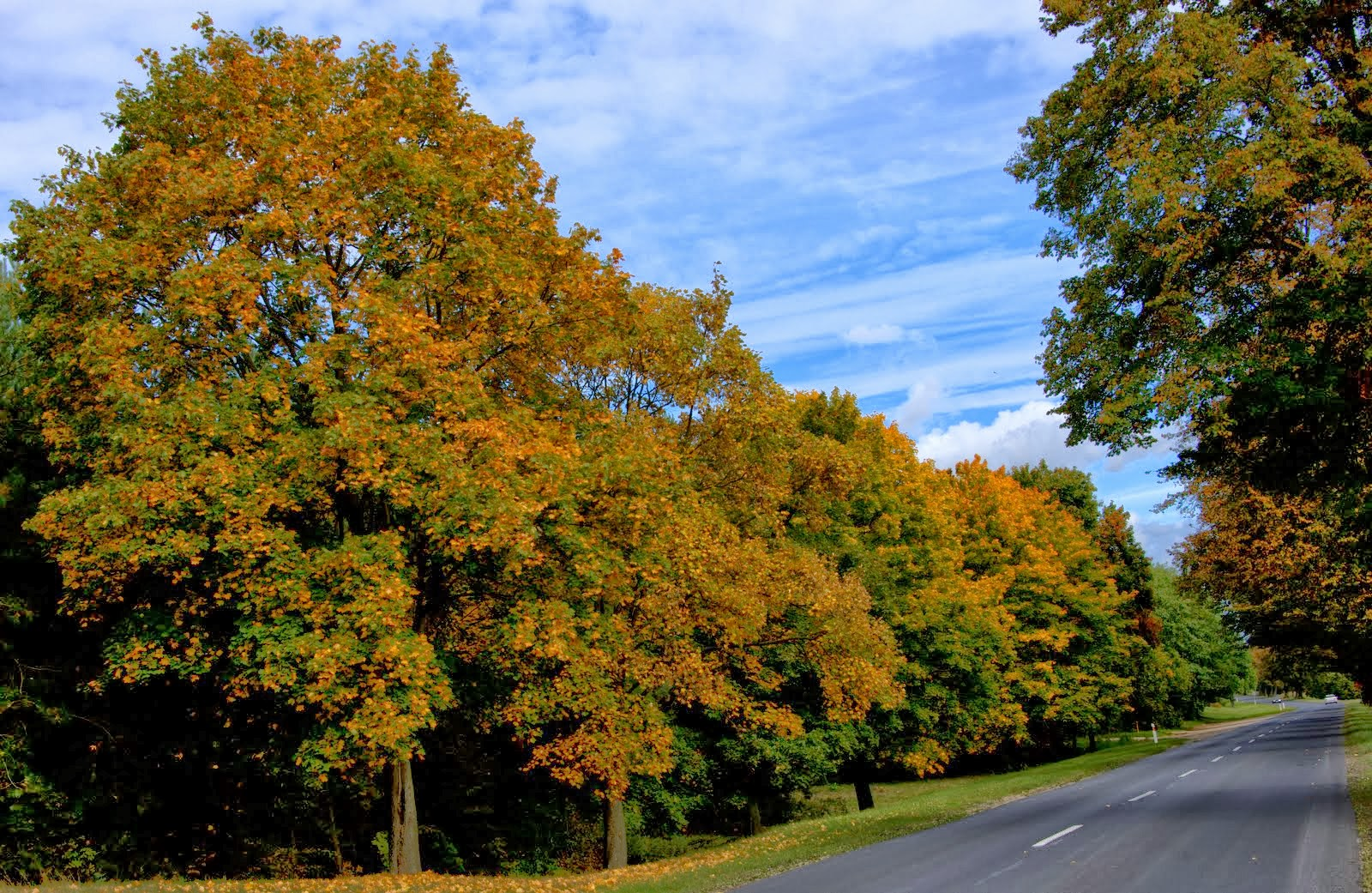

- Location within Poland
- Coordinates: 52°56′21″N 19°16′46″E
- Country: Poland
- Voivodeship: Kuyavian-Pomeranian
- County: Lipno
- Gmina: Chrostkowo
- Time zone: UTC+1 (CET)
  - Summer (DST): UTC+2 (CEST)
- Vehicle registration: CLI

Adamowo [adaˈmɔvɔ] is a village in the administrative district of Gmina Chrostkowo, within Lipno County, Kuyavian-Pomeranian Voivodeship, in north-central Poland.

== History ==
During the German occupation of Poland (World War II), Adamowo was one of the sites of executions of Poles, carried out by the Germans in 1939 as part of the Intelligenzaktion.
