= Makowiec, Kuyavian-Pomeranian Voivodeship =

Makowiec
- Village
- Location within Poland
- Coordinates: 52°54′N 19°14′E
- Country: Poland
- Voivodeship: Kuyavian-Pomeranian
- County: Lipno
- Gmina: Chrostkowo
- Time zone: UTC+1 (CET)
  - Summer (DST): UTC+2 (CEST)
- Vehicle registration: CLI

Makowiec [maˈkɔvjɛt͡s] is a village in the administrative district of Gmina Chrostkowo, within Lipno County, Kuyavian-Pomeranian Voivodeship, in north-central Poland.

Four Polish citizens were murdered by Nazi Germany in the village during World War II.
