= Krzywin, Choszczno County =

Krzywin
- Settlement
- Location within Poland
- Coordinates: 53°0′4″N 15°37′36″E
- Country: Poland
- Voivodeship: West Pomeranian
- County: Choszczno
- Gmina: Bierzwnik

Krzywin [ˈkʂɨvin] (German: Albertshof) is a settlement in the administrative district of Gmina Bierzwnik, within Choszczno County, West Pomeranian Voivodeship, in north-western Poland. It lies approximately 5 km (3 mi) south-west of Bierzwnik, 24 km (15 mi) south-east of Choszczno, and 84 km (52 mi) south-east of the regional capital Szczecin.

For the history of the region, see History of Pomerania.
