= Smędowa =

- Village
- Location within Poland
- Coordinates: 53°02′21″N 15°35′46″E
- Country: Poland
- Voivodeship: West Pomeranian
- County: Choszczno
- Gmina: Bierzwnik

Smędowa [smɛnˈdɔva] is a village in the administrative district of Gmina Bierzwnik, within Choszczno County, West Pomeranian Voivodeship, in north-western Poland.

For the history of the region, see History of Pomerania.
