= Günter Lörke =

East German cyclist

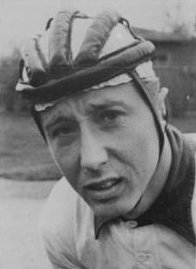

Personal information
- Born: 23 June 1935 (age 91) Sellnow, Germany

Cycling career
- Sport: Cycling
- Discipline: Track
- Role: Rider
Medal record
Men's track cycling
Representing Germany
Olympic Games
Silver medal – second place	1960 Rome	Team time trial

Günter Lörke (born 23 June 1935) is a former German cyclist. He won the silver medal in team time trial at the 1960 Summer Olympics.

Bevor, he was national Champion with his Team SC DHfK Leipzig in Teamtrial in 1957 and 1958.
