= Nowa Wieś, Gmina Chrostkowo =

Nowa Wieś
- Village
- Location within Poland
- Coordinates: 52°58′14″N 19°15′39″E
- Country: Poland
- Voivodeship: Kuyavian-Pomeranian
- County: Lipno
- Gmina: Chrostkowo

Nowa Wieś [ˈnɔva ˈvjɛɕ] is a village in the administrative district of Gmina Chrostkowo, within Lipno County, Kuyavian-Pomeranian Voivodeship, in north-central Poland.
