= Breń, West Pomeranian Voivodeship =

Breń
- Village
- Location within Poland
- Coordinates: 53°3′9″N 15°44′55″E
- Country: Poland
- Voivodeship: West Pomeranian
- County: Choszczno
- Gmina: Bierzwnik

Breń [brɛɲ] (German: Bernsee) is a village in the administrative district of Gmina Bierzwnik, within Choszczno County, West Pomeranian Voivodeship, in north-western Poland.
