= Pławno, Choszczno County =

Pławno
- Village
- Location within Poland
- Coordinates: 53°5′9″N 15°36′9″E
- Country: Poland
- Voivodeship: West Pomeranian
- County: Choszczno
- Gmina: Bierzwnik

Pławno [ˈpwavnɔ] (German: Plagow) is a village in the administrative district of Gmina Bierzwnik, within Choszczno County, West Pomeranian Voivodeship, in north-western Poland. It lies approximately 8 km (5 mi) north-west of Bierzwnik, 17 km (11 mi) south-east of Choszczno, and 78 km (48 mi) south-east of the regional capital Szczecin.

For the history of the region, see History of Pomerania.
