= Gołuchowo =

- Village
- Location within Poland
- Coordinates: 52°55′00″N 19°12′00″E
- Country: Poland
- Voivodeship: Kuyavian-Pomeranian
- County: Lipno
- Gmina: Chrostkowo

Gołuchowo [ɡɔwuˈxɔvɔ] is a village in the administrative district of Gmina Chrostkowo, within Lipno County, Kuyavian-Pomeranian Voivodeship, in north-central Poland.
