= Ho Henh Phươc =

Vietnamese decathlete (born 1940)

Personal information
- Nationality: Vietnamese
- Born: 26 August 1940 (age 84); Ninh Hải, French Indochina

Sport
- Sport: Athletics
- Event: Decathlon

Ho Henh Phươc (born 26 August 1940) is a Vietnamese athlete. He competed in the men's decathlon at the 1968 Summer Olympics.
