= Russ Hodge =

American decathlete (1939–2026)

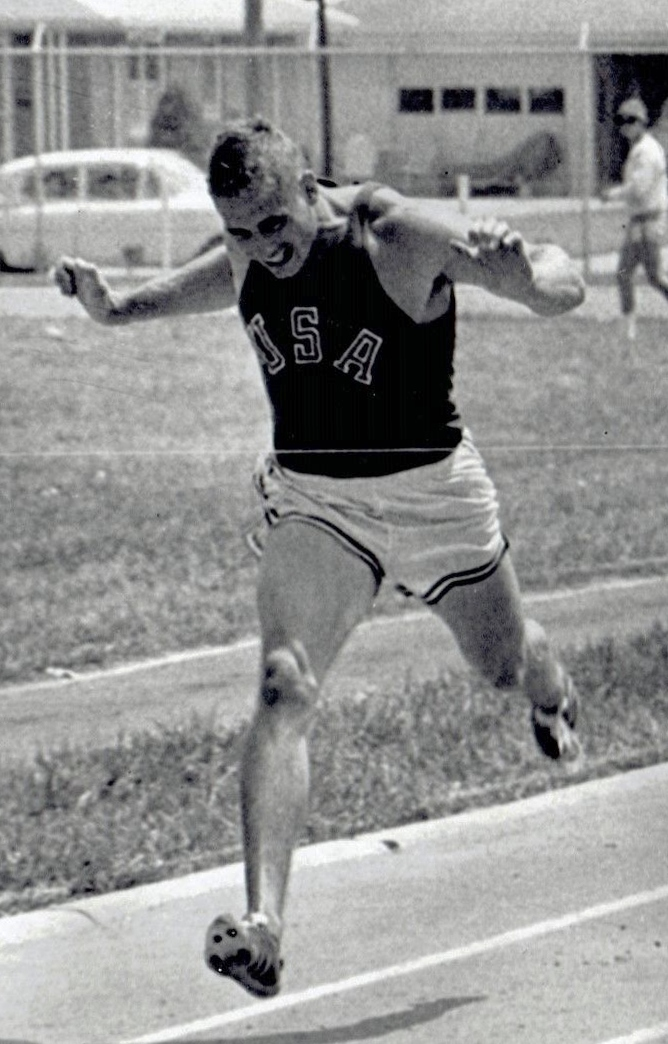
- Hodge in 1966

Personal information
- Born: September 12, 1939 Roscoe, New York, U.S.
- Died: May 6, 2026 (aged 86) Johnson City, New York, U.S.
- Height: 190 cm (6 ft 3 in)
- Weight: 102 kg (225 lb)

Sport
- Sport: Athletics
- Event: Decathlon
- Club: Santa Clara Valley Youth Village

Achievements and titles
- Personal bests: 100y – 9.6 (1966); 100 m – 10.2 (1970); 400 m – 47.9 (1970); LJ – 7.69 m (1966); SP – 18.56 m DT – 53.13 m (1969); JT – 64.49 m (1966)
Medal record
Representing the United States
Pan American Games
Silver medal – second place	1971 Cali	Decathlon

Russell Arden Hodge (September 12, 1939 – May 6, 2026) was an American track and field athlete, world record holder in decathlon (1966–1967), Olympic competitor from 1964, and silver medalist from the Pan American Games (1971). He was also the Chaplain for U.S. Olympians.

== Track and field career ==
Hodge competed at the 1963 Pan American Games in São Paulo, where he finished 4th in decathlon. He competed in decathlon at the 1964 Summer Olympics in Tokyo, where he placed ninth. In July 1966 he set a world record in decathlon at a competition in Los Angeles, with 8,230 points, a record which lasted until May 1967. Hodge received a silver medal in decathlon at the 1971 Pan American Games in Cali, Colombia with a score of 7314, behind winner Rick Wanamaker.

He finished fourth in the AAU National Championship in decathlon in 1963 and in 1964, and second in 1965 and 1966. In 1970 he finished second again, as he did in 1971, after a close race with Rick Wanamaker.

Hodge was an All-American athlete for the UCLA Bruins track and field team, finishing 7th in the shot put at the 1968 NCAA University Division outdoor track and field championships.

He did not compete at the Olympics after 1964. He was injured before the U.S. trials both in 1968 and 1972, and again in 1976.

== Personal life and death ==
Hodge was born in Roscoe, New York, on September 12, 1939, the son of Alice Arden, who placed ninth in the high jump at the 1936 Summer Olympics in Berlin. His father Russell Vincent Hodge was a professional basketball player, playing for the Long Island Ducklings.

Russ Hodge died in Johnson City, New York, on May 6, 2026, at the age of 86.

== Awards ==
In August 2003, both Hodge and his mother were honoured with the Sullivan County Historical Society "History Maker" award. They are the only mother-son Olympians in the United States' Olympic history.

Records
Preceded by (Chinese Taipei) Yang Chuan-kwang	Men's Decathlon World Record Holder; July 24, 1966 – May 14, 1967	Succeeded by (West Germany) Kurt Bendlin
