= Chojno, Lipno County =

Chojno
- Village
- Location within Poland
- Coordinates: 52°59′25″N 19°15′13″E
- Country: Poland
- Voivodeship: Kuyavian-Pomeranian
- County: Lipno
- Gmina: Chrostkowo

Chojno (Polish pronunciation: [ˈxɔjnɔ]) is a village in the administrative district of Gmina Chrostkowo, within Lipno County, Kuyavian-Pomeranian Voivodeship, in north-central Poland.
