= Jānis Lanka =

Latvian decathlete

Personal information
- Nationality: Latvian
- Born: 3 August 1940 (age 86) Liepāja, Soviet Union

Sport
- Sport: Athletics
- Event: Decathlon

Jānis Lanka (born 3 August 1940) is a Latvian athlete. He competed in the men's decathlon at the 1968 Summer Olympics, representing the Soviet Union.
