= Dominique Rakotorahalahy =

Malagasy decathlete

Personal information
- Nationality: Malagasy
- Born: 3 August 1944; Ambositra, Madagascar
- Died: 7 January 2021 (aged 76); Ambositra, Madagascar

Sport
- Sport: Athletics
- Event: Decathlon

Dominique Rakotorahalahy (3 August 1944 – 7 January 2021) was a Malagasy athlete. He competed in the men's decathlon at the 1968 Summer Olympics.
