= Kawno, Kuyavian-Pomeranian Voivodeship =

Kawno
- Village
- Location within Poland
- Coordinates: 52°58′6″N 19°9′58″E
- Country: Poland
- Voivodeship: Kuyavian-Pomeranian
- County: Lipno
- Gmina: Chrostkowo

Kawno [ˈkavnɔ] is a village in the administrative district of Gmina Chrostkowo, within Lipno County, Kuyavian-Pomeranian Voivodeship, in north-central Poland.
