= Norrie Foster =

Scottish athlete

Personal information
- Nationality: British (Scottish)
- Born: 23 July 1944 (age 82) Glasgow, Scotland

Sport
- Sport: Athletics
- Events: Decathlon, pole vault, hurdles, Long jump
- Club: Glasgow University AC; Shettleston Harriers

Norman "Norrie" Foster (born 23 July 1944) is a former track and field athlete from Scotland who competed at the 1966 British Empire and Commonwealth Games (now Commonwealth Games).

== Biography ==
Foster studied science at the University of Glasgow and was a member of their athletics club. He was also a member of the Shettleston Harriers.

He was an all-round athlete, winning significant events over the hurdles, long jump and pole vault and was therefore an excellent decathlete, winning three consecutive decathlon titles at the Scottish AAA Championships from 1964 to 1966..

Foster represented the Scottish Empire and Commonwealth Games team at the 1966 British Empire and Commonwealth Games in Kingston, Jamaica, participating in two events, the pole vault event and the decathlon.
