= Derek Clarke (athlete) =

British

Personal information
- Nationality: British (English)
- Born: 11 May 1937 Ipswich, England
- Died: 7 June 1997 (aged 60) Biggleswade, Bedfordshire, England

Sport
- Sport: Athletics
- Event: decathlon
- Club: Notts AC; Royal Air Force AC

Derek Stanley Clarke (11 May 1937 – 7 June 1997), was a male athlete who competed for England.

== Biography ==
He was born and grew up in Ipswich, England. In 1962 he was a corporal technician in the RAF, working with guided missiles By July 1966 he was a sergeant. He left the RAF in early 1968. and was also a Methodist preacher.

Clarke was selected by England to represent his country in Athletics events. He was a two times National champion.

On Friday 24 July 1964 in Nottingham, he broke the UK record of George McLachlan by 68 points with 6252. Just one month later on 7 and 8 August 1964 Clarke became the British decathlon champion after winning the British AAA Championships title at the 1964 AAA Championships in Loughborough.

Clarke regained the AAA title at the 1966 AAA Championships. Shortly afterwards he represented the 1966 England team in the decathlon, at the 1966 British Empire and Commonwealth Games in Kingston, Jamaica. He also competed in the 1966 European Athletics Championships – Men's decathlon.

== Personal life ==
He lived on Welbeck Road, Radcliffe-on-Trent. With wife Joyce, he had four children, including son Tim.
