= Bernard Castang =

French decathlete (1944–1997)

Personal information
- Born: 9 April 1944 Sisteron, France
- Died: 14 October 1997 (aged 53)
- Height: 190 cm (6 ft 3 in)
- Weight: 95 kg (209 lb)

Sport
- Country: France
- Sport: Athetics, Rugby
- Event: Decathlon
Medal record
Universiade
Bronze medal – third place	1967 Tokyo	Decathlon

Bernard Castang (9 April 1944 in Sisteron, France – 14 October 1997) was a French athlete. Commonly thought as one of the most talented decathletes that represented France during the 1960s. He also played rugby. Rugby (3rd line) from 1969 to 1978 - Played in the 1st division from 1969 to 1978 at ES Avignon (1969-1973 then 1977–1978) and at La Voulte sportif (1973-1977) French National Outdoor Championships winner in 1966 with 7514 points in the decathlon and 1967 with 7580 points. Bronze winner in the decathlon with 7444 points at the 1967 Summer Universiade in Tokyo, Japan. Top 20 decathlete at the 1966 European Championships in Budapest, Hungary with 6709 points. Personal best in decathlon 7853.
