= Bill Toomey =

American decathlete

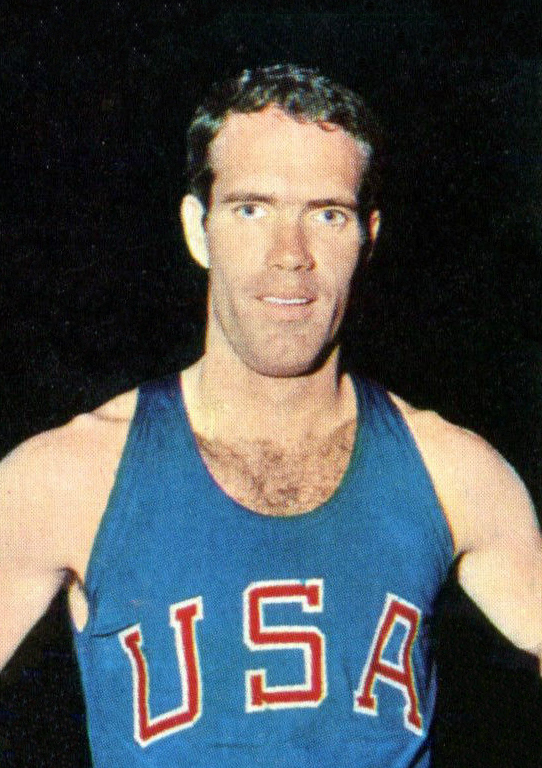
- Bill Toomey in 1968

Personal information
- Born: January 10, 1939 (age 87) Philadelphia, Pennsylvania, U.S.
- Height: 1.87 m (6 ft 2 in)
- Weight: 87 kg (192 lb)

Sport
- Sport: Athletics
- Event: Decathlon
- Club: Southern California Striders

Achievements and titles
- Personal bests: 100 – 10.3 (1966); 200 – 21.2 (1966); 400 – 45.6 (1968); 1500 – 4:12.7 (1964); 110H – 14.2 (1969); 400H – 51.7 (1961); HJ – 6–6¾ (2.00) (1969); PV – 14–0¼ (4.27) (1969); LJ – 26–0¼ (7.93) (1969); SP – 47–2¼ (14.38) (1969); DT – 154–2 (46.99) (1969); JT – 225–8 (68.78) (1969); Dec – 8309 (1969)
Medal record
Representing the United States
Olympic Games
Gold medal – first place	1968 Mexico City	Decathlon
Pan American Games
Gold medal – first place	1967 Winnipeg	Decathlon
Universiade
Gold medal – first place	1965 Budapest	Decathlon

William Anthony Toomey (born January 10, 1939) is an American former track and field competitor and was the 1968 Olympic decathlon champion.

== Athletic and broadcast career ==
Toomey was an All-American for the Colorado Buffaloes track and field team, finishing 7th in the 400 meters hurdles at the 1961 NCAA track and field championships.

He won 23 of the 38 decathlons he competed in, scoring over 8,000 points a dozen times. He was on the cover of the October 1969 issue of Track and Field News.. His 400m time of 45.68 set during the 1968 Olympics was the decathlon world best until 2015 when it was surpassed by Ashton Eaton's 45.00.

Toomey was head coach in track and field for the UC Irvine Anteaters in the early 1970s. Before that he worked as a television broadcaster and marketing consultant.

Toomey also competed in Masters Track and Field.

He married British 1964 Olympic long jump champion Mary Rand.

Records
Preceded by Kurt Bendlin	Men's decathlon world record holder December 11, 1969 – September 8, 1972	Succeeded by Mykola Avilov
Awards and achievements
Preceded by (United States) Bob Beamon	Track & Field Athlete of the Year; 1969	Succeeded by (United States) Randy Matson
