= Stalmierz =

- Village
- Location within Poland
- Coordinates: 52°58′N 19°12′E
- Country: Poland
- Voivodeship: Kuyavian-Pomeranian
- County: Lipno
- Gmina: Chrostkowo

Stalmierz [ˈstalmjɛʂ] is a village in the administrative district of Gmina Chrostkowo, within Lipno County, Kuyavian-Pomeranian Voivodeship, in north-central Poland.
