= Hansruedi Kunz =

Swiss decathlete (born 1945)

Personal information
- Nationality: Swiss
- Born: 26 May 1945 (age 80) Reinach, Switzerland

Sport
- Sport: Athletics
- Event: Decathlon

Hansruedi Kunz (born 26 May 1945) is a Swiss athlete. He competed in the men's decathlon at the 1968 Summer Olympics.
