= Janiszewo, Lipno County =

Janiszewo
- Village
- Location within Poland
- Coordinates: 52°56′N 19°15′E
- Country: Poland
- Voivodeship: Kuyavian-Pomeranian
- County: Lipno
- Gmina: Chrostkowo

Janiszewo [janiˈʂɛvɔ] is a village in the administrative district of Gmina Chrostkowo, within Lipno County, Kuyavian-Pomeranian Voivodeship, in north-central Poland.
