= Werner Duttweiler =

Swiss athlete

Personal information
- Nationality: Swiss
- Born: 21 November 1939 (age 86)

Sport
- Sport: Athletics
- Event: Decathlon

Werner Duttweiler (born 21 November 1939) is a Swiss athlete. He competed in the decathlon at the 1964 Summer Olympics and the 1968 Summer Olympics.
