= Walter Dießl =

Personal information
- Nationality: Austrian
- Born: 14 April 1943 (age 83) Linz, Austria

Sport
- Sport: Athletics
- Event: Decathlon

Walter Dießl (born 14 April 1943) is an Austrian athlete. He competed in the men's decathlon at the 1968 Summer Olympics.
