= Clive Longe =

British decathlete

Personal information
- Nationality: British
- Born: 23 February 1939 British Guiana
- Died: 27 December 1986 (aged 47) Hamilton, Bermuda

Sport
- Sport: Athletics
- Event: Decathlon
Medal record
Men's Athletics
Representing Wales
Commonwealth Games
Silver medal – second place	1966 Kingston	Decathlon

Clive Citrine Olaf Longe (23 February 1939 – 27 December 1986) was a British athlete and coach. He represented Great Britain in the men's decathlon at the 1968 Summer Olympics, where he placed 13th. He was inducted into the Welsh Athletics hall of fame in 2024.

== Early life ==
Longe was born on 23 February 1939 in British Guiana. He attended Loughborough University. He served in the Royal Air Force.

== Career ==
When Longe lived in Guyana, he was a basketball player. When both him and decathlete Hywel Williams were stationed at RAF St. Athan, he began to compete in athletics. During his career in athletics, Longe held records for discus, pole vault, and decathlon in Wales, the latter of which he held the records for the entirety of Britain.

He represented the 1966 Welsh team at the 1966 British Empire and Commonwealth Games in Kingston, Jamaica, participating in one event; winning the silver medal in the decathlon.

He competed in the men's decathlon at the 1968 Summer Olympics, where he placed 13th.

After retiring from athletics, Longe served as the national athletics coach for Bermuda.

Longe was inducted into the Welsh Athletics hall of fame posthumously in 2024.

== Death ==
On Christmas Eve 1986, he strangled his estranged girlfriend to death, before killing himself two days later. He was believed to suffer from depression after she broke up with him.
