= Urs Trautmann =

Swiss decathlete

Personal information
- Nationality: Swiss
- Born: 30 March 1940 (age 86) Balsthal, Switzerland

Sport
- Sport: Athletics
- Event: Decathlon

Urs Trautmann (born 30 March 1940) is a Swiss athlete. He competed in the men's decathlon at the 1968 Summer Olympics.
