= Ed de Noorlander =

Dutch decathlete (1945–2024)

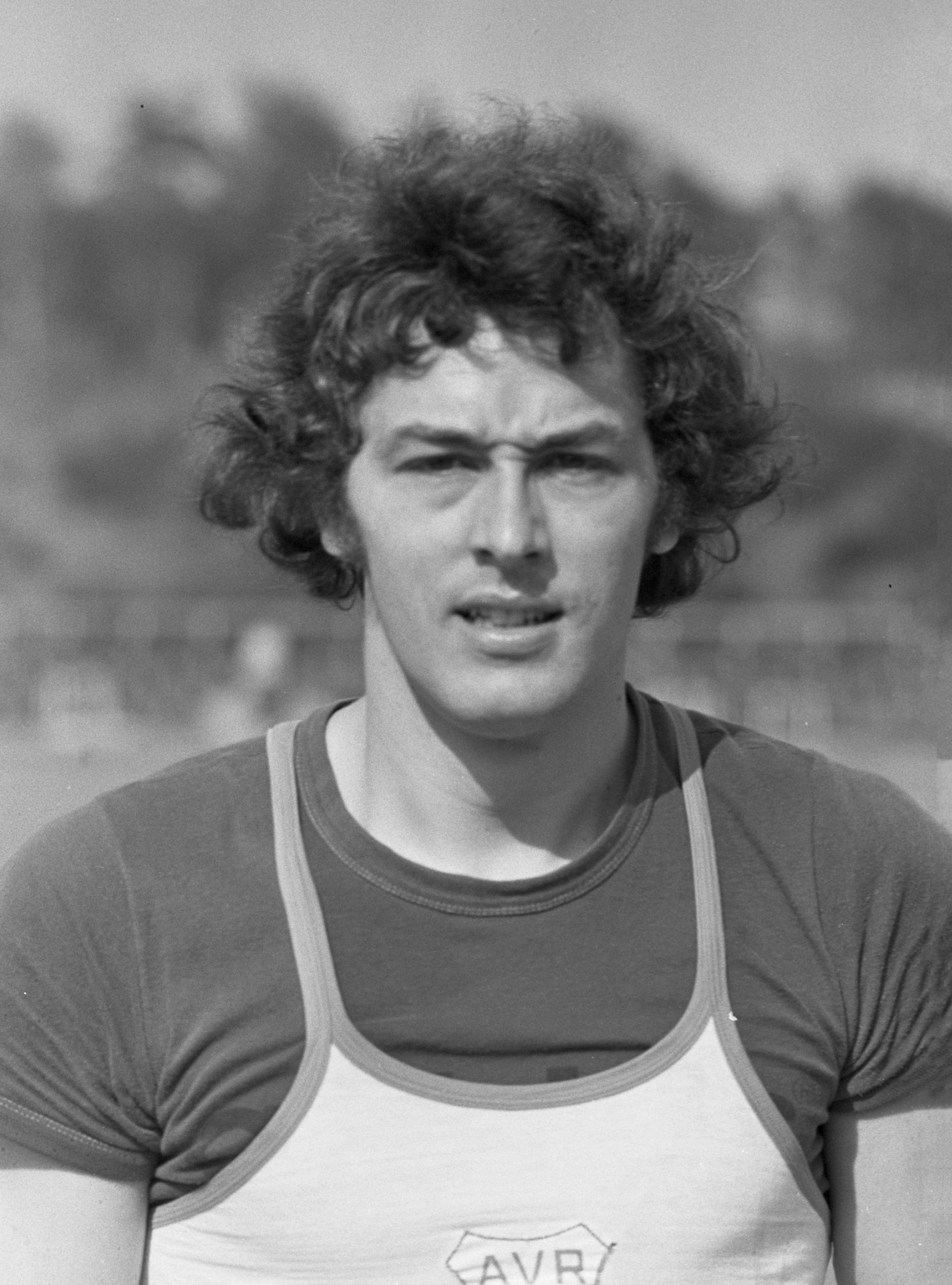
- De Noorlander in 1973

Personal information
- Born: 10 March 1945 Rotterdam, German-occupied Netherlands
- Died: 3 November 2024 (aged 79)
- Height: 1.92 m (6 ft 4 in)
- Weight: 92 kg (203 lb)

Sport
- Sport: Decathlon
- Club: AVR, Rotterdam

Eduard Jan de Noorlander (10 March 1945 – 3 November 2024) was a Dutch decathlete who finished in ninth place at the 1968 Summer Olympics. He died on 3 November 2024, at the age of 79.

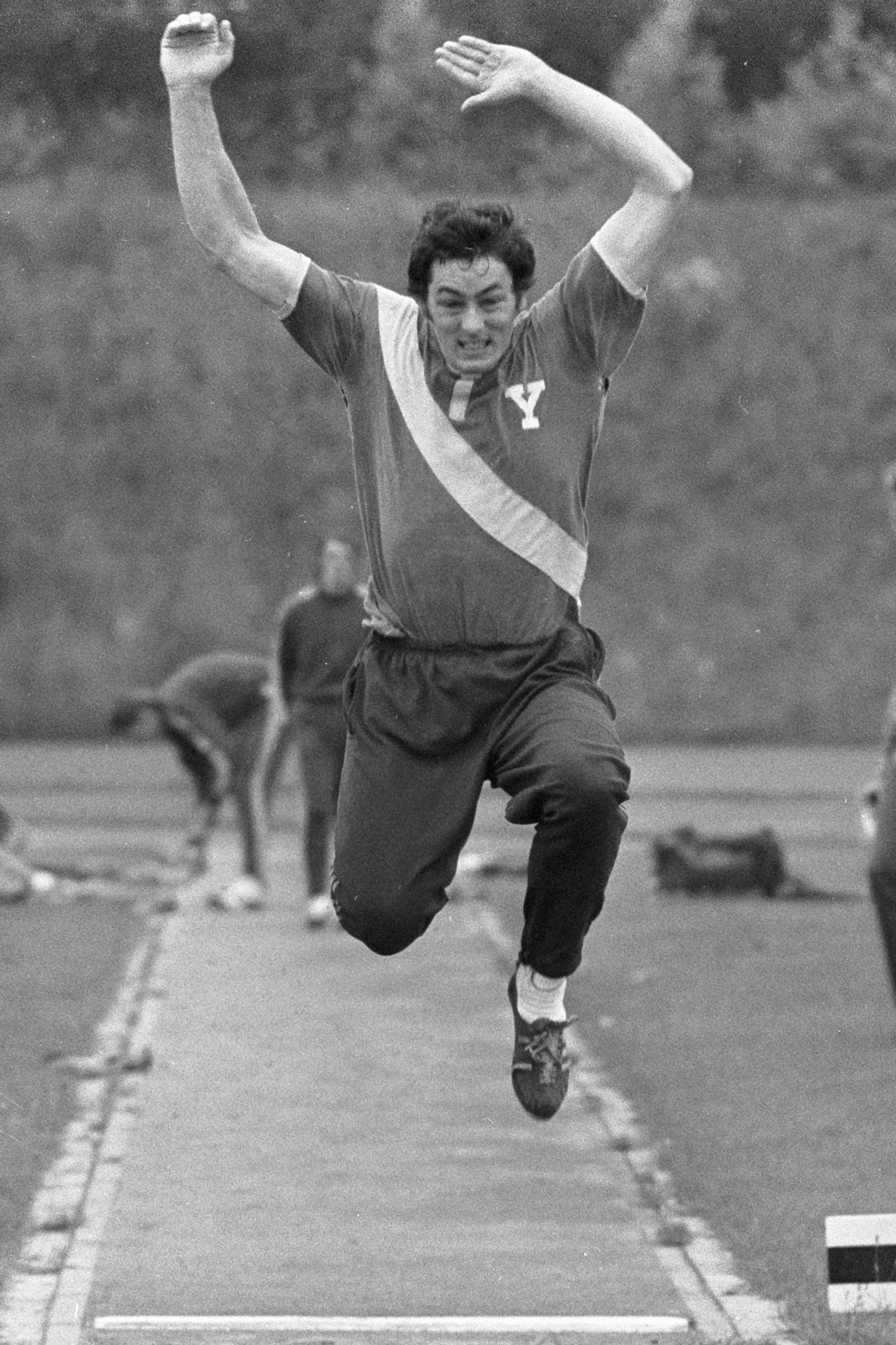
De Noorlander in 1972

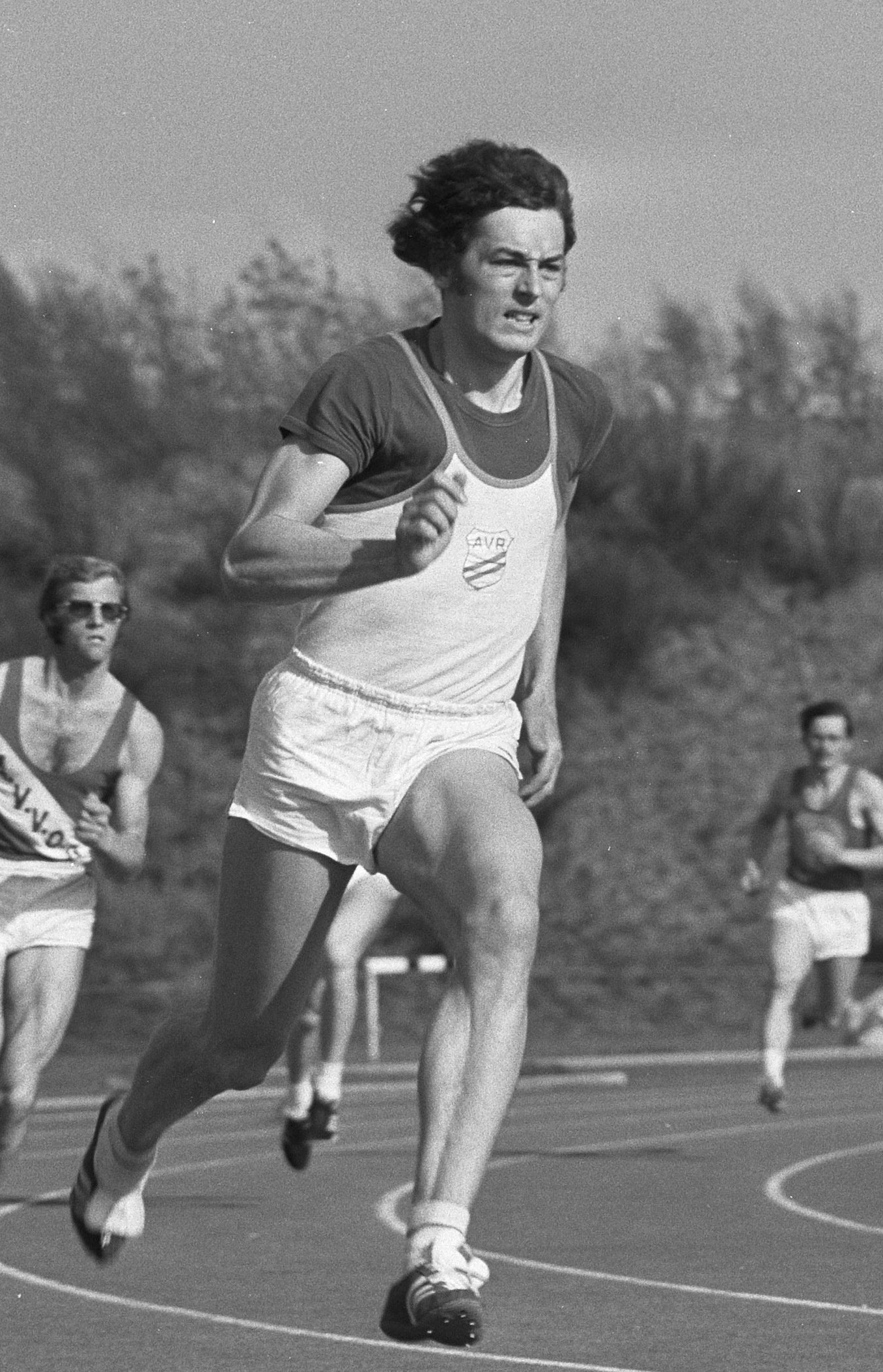
De Noorlander in 1973

Awards
Preceded by Piet Olofsen	Herman van Leeuwen Cup; 1968	Succeeded by Ben Lesterhuis
