= Bierzwnik, Choszczno County =

Bierzwnik
- Village
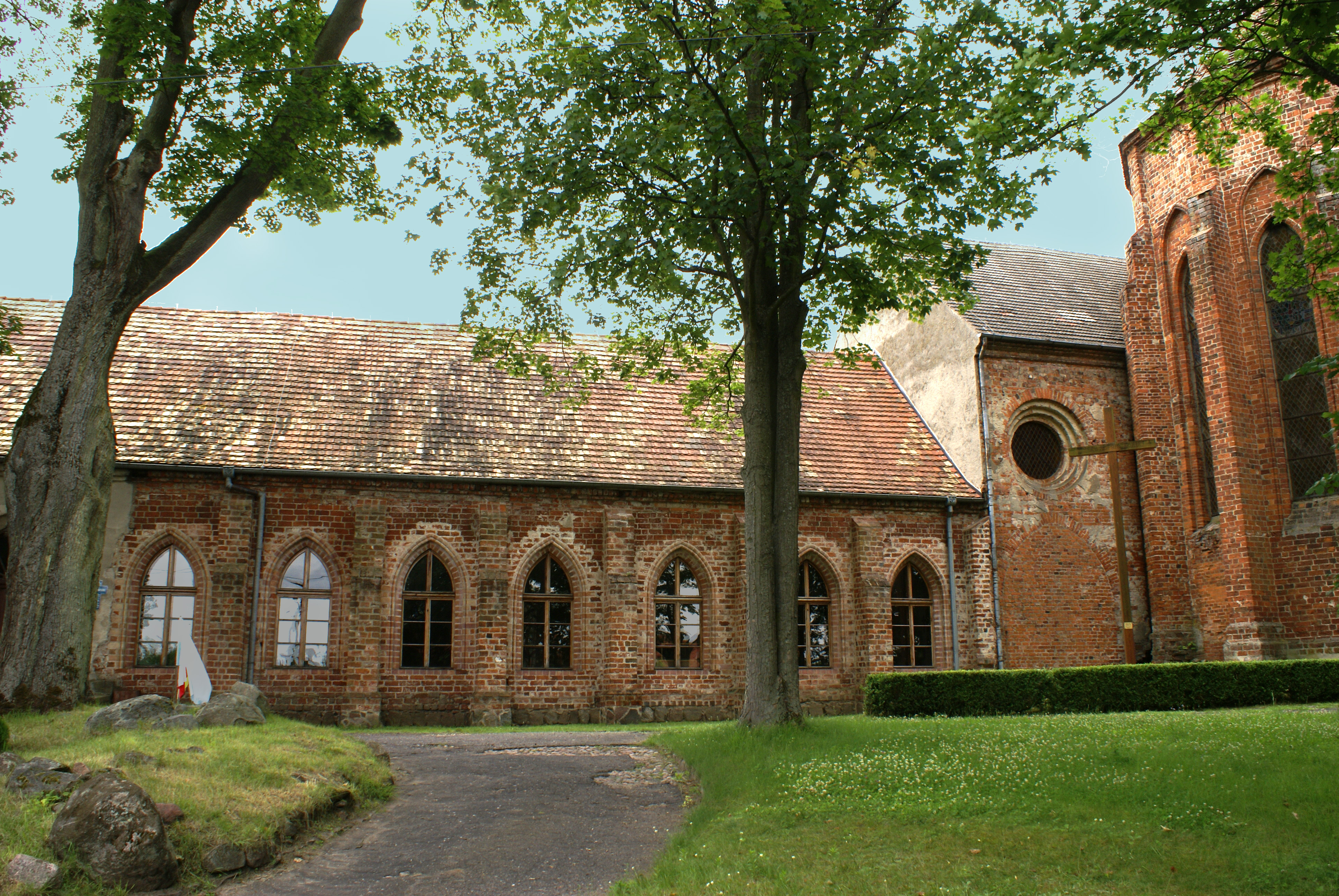
- Remnants of a monastery

- Location within Poland
- Coordinates: 53°2′N 15°40′E
- Country: Poland
- Voivodeship: West Pomeranian
- County: Choszczno
- Gmina: Bierzwnik
- Population: 1,200
- Website: http://www.bierzwnik.pl

Bierzwnik [ˈbjɛʐvnik] (German: Marienwalde) is a village in Choszczno County, West Pomeranian Voivodeship, in north-western Poland. It is the seat of the gmina (administrative district) called Gmina Bierzwnik. It lies approximately 24 km (15 mi) south-east of Choszczno (Arnswalde) and 84 km (52 mi) south-east of the regional capital Szczecin (Stettin).
