= Pan American Combined Events Cup =

Track and field competition

The Pan American Combined Events Cup (Spanish: Copa Panamericana de Pruebas Combinadas) is a track and field competition in men's decathlon and women's heptathlon. Organized by the Association of Panamerican Athletics (APA), newly constituted in 2011, it is an annual contest for combined events athletes representing countries in the region. It is typically held in late May or June.

The competition was launched in 2005 as part of the IAAF Combined Events Challenge as NACAC Combined Events Championships, and was initially organized by the North American, Central American and Caribbean Athletic Association (NACAC), with the first edition taking place in San Juan, Puerto Rico. The event was repeated in San Juan the following year and had its third outing in 2007 in Santo Domingo in the Dominican Republic. The size of the competition was expanded in 2008 as it was renamed the Pan American Combined Events Championships with the organization of the event being transferred to the Pan American Athletics Commission, a subdivision of the Pan American Sports Organization (PASO). It became open to combined events specialists representing any of the countries in the Americas. A record of 40 athletes from 15 countries took part in that edition.

The championships underwent another name change the following year, being held in Havana, Cuba as the Americas Combined Events Cup. Headed by the Cuban Federation President, former Olympic champion Alberto Juantorena, it was incorporated into that year's Barrientos Memorial, Cuba's national track and field championships. No edition was held in 2010 and the event returned under its inaugural moniker for the 2011 season. In the year 2012, the Championships were renamed to its present name. The inaugural Pan American Combined Events Cup took place in Ottawa, Canada.

Cuba's Yordanis García holds the championship record for the decathlon with his score of 8496 points. The heptathlon best is 6068 points by Cuban Yorgelis Rodríguez. Five athletes have won at the event on at least two occasions: Maurice Smith of Jamaica, Ryan Harlan and Scott Filip of the United States, as well as Yordanis García and Yorgelis Rodríguez of Cuba.

The 14th event, originally scheduled to be held May 2021 in Ottawa, Canada, was indefinitely suspended.

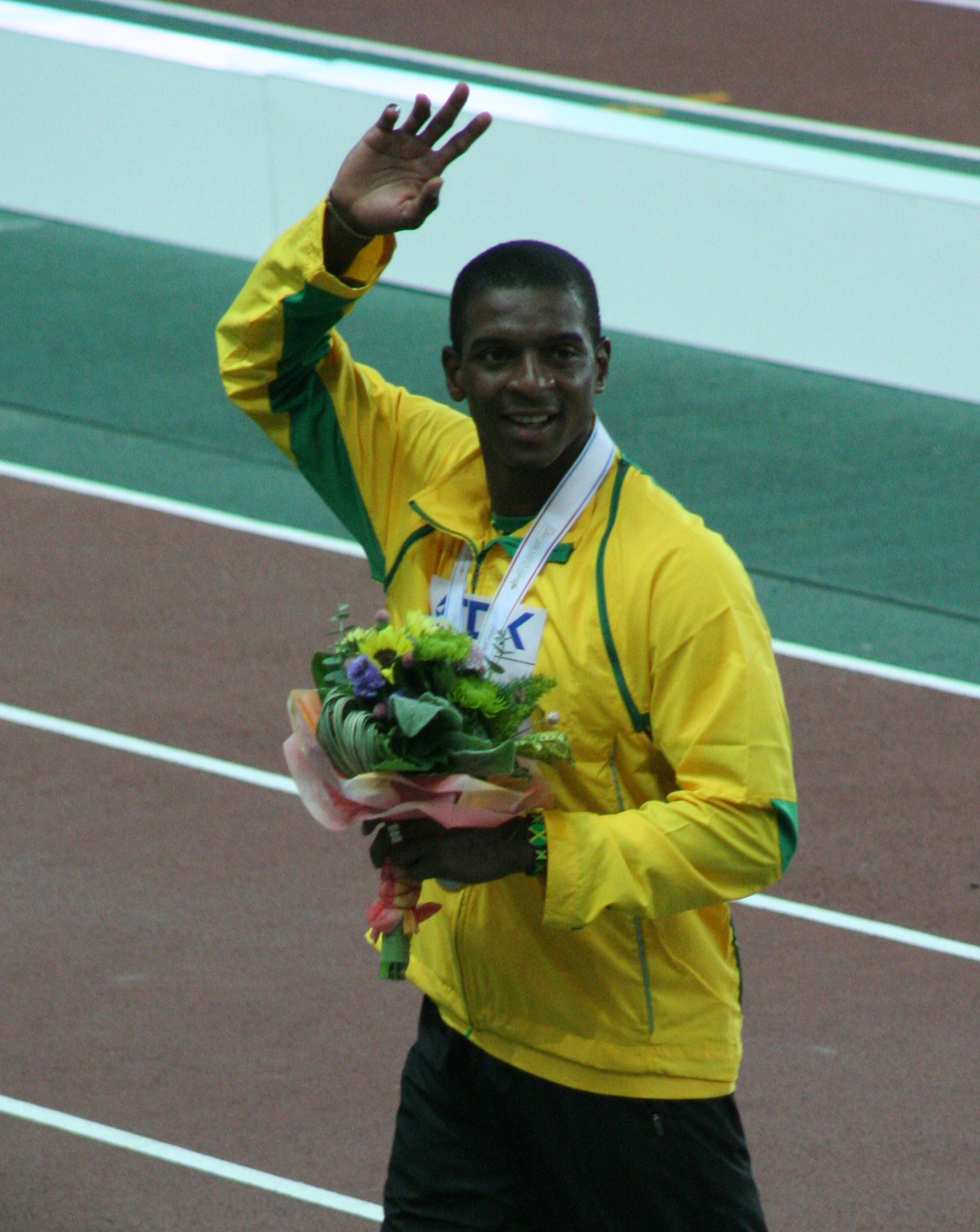
Two-time decathlon champion Maurice Smith at the 2007 World Championships

== Editions ==
Edition	Year	Venue	City	Country	Date	No. of athletes	No. of nations
1st	2005	Estadio Sixto Escobar	San Juan	Puerto Rico	28–29 May	27	9
2nd	2006	Estadio Sixto Escobar	San Juan	Puerto Rico	25–26 August	15	6
3rd	2007	Felix Sanchez Stadium	Santo Domingo	Dominican Republic	26–27 May	27	10
4th	2008	Felix Sanchez Stadium	Santo Domingo	Dominican Republic	31 May – 1 June	41	15
5th	2009	Estadio Panamericano	Havana	Cuba	29–30 May	32	7
6th	2011	Usain Bolt Track	Kingston	Jamaica	27–28 May	28 (+ 1 invited)	12 (+ 1 invited)
7th	2012	Terry Fox Stadium	Ottawa	Canada	26–27 May	27 (+ 1 invited + 15 local)	10 (+ 1 invited)
8th	2013	Terry Fox Stadium	Ottawa	Canada	1–2 June	29 (+ 29 local)	12
9th	2014	Terry Fox Stadium	Ottawa	Canada	16–17 July		
10th	2015	Terry Fox Stadium	Ottawa	Canada	20–21 June	44 (+ 1 invited)	10
11th	2016	Terry Fox Stadium	Ottawa	Canada	17–18 June		
12th	2017	Terry Fox Stadium	Ottawa	Canada	4–5 July	43	11
13th	2018	Terry Fox Stadium	Ottawa	Canada	3–4 July	34 (+3 invited)	7 (+3 invited)
14th	2021 (canceled)	Terry Fox Stadium	Ottawa	Canada	15–16 May		

== Records ==
Event	Athlete	Record	Date	Ref.
Men's decathlon	Yordanis García (CUB)	8496 points	29–30 May 2009	
100 m	Damian Warner (CAN)	10.43 s (+1.9 m/s)	17 July 2014	guest performance
100 m	Luiz Alberto de Araújo (BRA)	10.66 s (+1.9 m/s)	31 May 2008	
Long jump	Yunior Díaz (CUB)	7.75 m (+0.3 m/s)	29 May 2009	
Shot put	Maurice Smith (JAM)	16.88 m	27 May 2011	
High jump	Leonel Suárez (CUB)	2.12 m	26 May 2007	
High jump	Bilal Abdullah (CAN)	2.12 m	17 June 2016	
400 m	Yunior Díaz (CUB)	47.34 s	29 May 2009	
110 m hurdles	Damian Warner (CAN)	13.89 s (+0.5 m/s)	28 May 2011	
Discus throw	Maurice Smith (JAM)	50.62 m	29 May 2005	
Pole vault	Paul Terek (USA)	5.30 m	29 May 2005	
Javelin throw	Yordanis García (CUB)	68.10 m	30 May 2009	
1500 m	Jason Mackenzie (CAN)	4:15.18 min	18 July 2014	guest performance
1500 m	Chris Helwick (USA)	4:22.60 min	1 June 2008	
Women's heptathlon	Yorgelis Rodríguez (CUB)	6068 points	20–21 June 2015	
100 m hurdles	Uhunoma Osazuwa (NGR)	13.28 s	26 May 2012	guest performance
100 m hurdles	Virginia Johnson (USA)	13.16 s (+3.4 m/s)	25 August 2006	
High jump	Sharon Day (USA)	1.93 m	29 May 2009	
Shot put	Quintunya Chapman (USA)	14.88 m	17 June 2016	
200 m	Uhunoma Osazuwa (NGR)	23.85 s (−1.3 m/s)	26 May 2012	guest performance
200 m	Virginia Johnson (USA)	23.91 s (+1.7 m/s)	25 August 2006	
Long jump	Yarianny Argüelles (CUB)	6.47 m (+1.8 m/s)	30 May 2009	
Javelin throw	Coralys Ortiz (PUR)	49.24 m	29 May 2005	
800 m	Jen Cotten (CAN)	2:11.02 min	26 May 2012	

== Medalists ==
=== Senior ===
Key: Meet record

==== Decathlon ====
Year	Gold		Silver		Bronze	
2005	Maurice Smith (JAM)	8232 pts	Ryan Harlan (USA)	7997 pts	Paul Terek (USA)	7923 pts
2006	Ryan Harlan (USA)	7966 pts	Paul Terek (USA)	7884 pts	Chris Boyles (USA)	7703 pts
2007	Ryan Harlan (USA)	7901 pts	Leonel Suárez (CUB)	7843 pts	Yunior Díaz (CUB)	7816 pts
2008	Chris Helwick (USA)	7820 pts	Iván Scolfaro da Silva (BRA)	7783 pts	Chris Randolph (USA)	7747 pts
2009	Yordanis García (CUB)	8496 pts	Yunior Díaz (CUB)	7920 pts	Alexei Chivas (CUB)	7808 pts
2011	Maurice Smith (JAM)	8078 pts	Damian Warner (CAN)	7760 pts	Chris Helwick (USA)	7609 pts
2012	José Mendieta (CUB)	7792 pts	Eric Broadbent (USA)	7498 pts	Roman Garibay (MEX)	7149 pts
2013	Yordanis García (CUB)	8141 pts	José Mendieta (CUB)	7766 pts	Gray Horn (USA)	7581 pts
2014	Yordanis García (CUB)	8179 pts	José Mendieta (CUB)	7559 pts	James Turner (CAN)	7408 pts
2015	Yordanis García (CUB)	7977 pts	Juan Carlos de la Cruz (DOM)	7504 pts	Kevin Lazas (CAN)	7483 pts
2016	Scott Filip (USA)	7726 pts	Rostam Turner (CAN)	7565 pts	Michael Morrison (USA)	7422 pts
2017	Pierce LePage (CAN)	7948 pts	Taylor Stewart (CAN)	7882 pts	Robert Robinson (USA)	7650 pts
2018	Scott Filip (USA)	7643 pts	Mitch Modin (USA)	7495 pts	Jack Flood (USA)	7376 pts

==== Heptathlon ====
Year	Gold		Silver		Bronze	
2005	Fiona Asigbee (USA)	5868 pts	Tracye Lawyer-Thomas (USA)	5603 pts	Jackie Poulson (USA)	5499 pts
2006	Virginia Johnson (USA)	5991 pts	Hyleas Fountain (USA)	5956 pts	Fiona Asigbee (USA)	5779 pts
2007	Gretchen Quintana (CUB)	6007 pts	Fiona Asigbee (USA)	5770 pts	Lela Nelson (USA)	5760 pts
2008	Lela Nelson (USA)	5944 pts	Ryanne Dupree (USA)	5704 pts	Yasmiany Pedroso (CUB)	5659 pts
2009	Sharon Day (USA)	6063 pts	Yarianny Argüelles (CUB)	5982 pts	Lela Nelson (USA)	5817 pts
2011	Emily Pearson (USA)	5585 pts	Salcia Slack (JAM)	5534 pts	Naomi Osazuwa (USA)	5506 pts ^{1}
2012	Yorgelis Rodríguez (CUB)	5819 pts ^{2}	Jen Cotten (CAN)	5656 pts	Yasmiani Pedroso (CUB)	5650 pts
2013	Yorgelis Rodríguez (CUB)	5947 pts	Ana Camila Pirelli (PAR)	5683 pts	Lindsay Schwartz (USA)	5645 pts
2014	Natasha Jackson (CAN)	5928 pts^{3}	Lindsay Schwartz (USA)	5835 pts	Rachael McIntosh (CAN)	5763 pts
2015	Yorgelis Rodríguez (CUB)	6068 pts	Maddie Buttinger (CAN)	5643 pts ^{4}		
2016	Quintunya Chapman (USA)	6035 pts	Allison Reaser (USA)	5988 pts	Jessica Zelinka (CAN)	5855 pts
2017	Niki Oudenaarden (CAN)	6000 pts	Sami Spenner (USA)	5986 pts	Rachael McIntosh (CAN)	5783 pts
2018	Georgia Ellenwood (CAN)	6026 pts	Chari Hawkins (USA)	6004 pts	Nikole Oudenaarden (CAN)	5833 pts

- ^2 Nigeria's Uhunoma Osazuwa received a special invitation allowing her to compete as a guest athlete and she finished first in the heptathlon with a score of 6049 points.
- ^3 Jillian Drouin from Canada was 1st achieving 5972 pts competing only for the Canadian Senior Championships.
- ^4 Nigeria's Uhunoma Osazuwa received a special invitation allowing her to compete as a guest athlete and she finished second in the heptathlon with a score of 6008 points.

=== Junior ===
==== Decathlon ====
Year	Gold		Silver		Bronze	
2014	Steele Wasik (USA)	7004 pts	Hellerson Pereira da Costa (BRA)	6853 pts	Vincent Lanctôt-Reeves (CAN)	6647 pts
2016	Nathaniel Mechler (CAN)	5519 pts	Jose Paulino (DOM)	5005 pts	Ian West (TRI)	4781 pts

==== Heptathlon ====
Year	Gold		Silver		Bronze	
2014	Genevieve Gagné (CAN)	5028 pts	Lais da Silva Pereira (BRA)	4886 pts	Allison Frantz (CAN)	4718 pts^{1}
2016	Khemani Roberts (TRI)	4178 pts	Lauren Quann (CAN)	3661 pts	Olivia Leon (CAN)	3140 pts

- ^1 Katelyn Lehner was 3rd achieving 4879 pts, and Keely Watts-Watling was 4th achieving 4853 pts, both athletes competing only for the Canadian Junior Championships.
