= 2009 Americas Combined Events Cup =

- Organisers: Pan American Athletics Commission
- Edition: 5th
- Date: May 29–30
- Host city: La Habana, Cuba
- Venue: Estadio Panamericano
- Participation: 32 athletes from 7 nations

The 2009 Americas Combined Events Cup were held in La Habana, Cuba, at the Estadio Panamericano on May 29–30, 2009. A detailed report on the event and an appraisal of the results was given.

Complete results were published.

== Medallists ==
| Event | Gold | | Silver | | Bronze | |
|---|---|---|---|---|---|---|
| Men's Decathlon | Yordanis García; Cuba | 8496 | Yunior Díaz; Cuba | 7920 | Alexis Chivás; Cuba | 7808 |
| Women's Heptathlon | Sharon Day; United States | 6063 | Yarianny Argüelles; Cuba | 5982 | Lela Nelson; United States | 5817 |

== Results ==
=== Men's Decathlon ===
Key

The highest mark recorded in each event is highlighted in yellow

| Rank | Athlete | Overall points | 100 m | LJ | SP | HJ | 400 m | 110 m H | DT | PV | JT | 1500 m |
|---|---|---|---|---|---|---|---|---|---|---|---|---|
| 1st place, gold medalist(s) | Yordanis García; Cuba | 8496 CR | 888; 10.88 s w:+0.1 | 900; 7.36 m w:+0.2 | 882; 16.50 m | 896; 2.10 m | 872; 48.77 s | 965; 14.07 s w:-0.5 | 746; 43.97 m | 849; 4.80 m | 860; 68.10 m | 638; 4:46.80 min |
| 2nd place, silver medalist(s) | Yunior Díaz; Cuba | 7920 | 906; 10.80 s w:+0.2 | 997; 7.75 m w:+0.3 | 765; 14.59 m | 785; 1.98 m | 941; 47.34 s | 848; 15.01 s w:-0.3 | 681; 40.81 m | 673; 4.20 m | 673; 55.66 m | 651; 4:44.70 min |
| 3rd place, bronze medalist(s) | Alexis Chivás; Cuba | 7808 | 838; 11.10 s w:+0.2 | 925; 7.46 m w:+0.1 | 823; 15.54 m | 785; 1.98 m | 695; 52.68 s | 905; 14.55 s w:-0.1 | 777; 45.50 m | 790; 4.60 m | 634; 53.06 m | 636; 4:47.20 min |
| 4 | Paul Terek; United States | 7430 | 717; 11.67 s w:+0.1 | 704; 6.53 m w:+0.1 | 765; 14.60 m | 731; 1.92 m | 831; 49.64 s | 745; 15.89 s w:-0.3 | 732; 43.28 m | 880; 4.90 m | 664; 55.10 m | 661; 4:43.10 min |
| 5 | Yosley Azcuy; Cuba - B | 7361 | 804; 11.26 s w:+0.1 | 811; 6.99 m w:+0.0 | 713; 13.75 m | 627; 1.80 m | 816; 49.96 s | 916; 14.46 s w:-0.5 | 722; 42.84 m | 790; 4.60 m | 627; 52.60 m | 535; 5:04.30 min |
| 6 | José Angel Mendieta; Cuba - B | 7192 | 812; 11.22 s w:+0.2 | 869; 7.23 m w:+1.2 | 658; 12.85 m | 731; 1.92 m | 823; 49.81 s | 884; 14.72 s w:-0.3 | 612; 37.42 m | 509; 3.60 m | 649; 54.10 m | 645; 4:45.60 min |
| 7 | Chris Boyles; United States | 7131 | 730; 11.61 s w:+0.2 | 697; 6.50 m w:+0.2 | 744; 14.25 m | 785; 1.98 m | 697; 52.64 s | 805; 15.37 s w:-0.1 | 736; 43.52 m | 819; 4.70 m | 630; 52.76 m | 488; 5:12.80 min |
| 8 | Marcos Sánchez-Valle; Puerto Rico | 6995 | 804; 11.26 s w:+0.2 | 682; 6.43 m w:+1.0 | 752; 14.39 m | 705; 1.89 m | 835; 49.57 s | 749; 15.86 s w:-0.5 | 627; 38.14 m | 731; 4.40 m | 615; 51.76 m | 495; 5:11.60 min |
| 9 | Steven Marrero; Puerto Rico | 6952 | 738; 11.57 s w:+0.2 | 760; 6.77 m w:+0.1 | 701; 13.56 m | 577; 1.74 m | 822; 49.84 s | 693; 16.36 s w:-0.3 | 677; 40.61 m | 731; 4.40 m | 613; 51.64 m | 640; 4:46.50 min |
| 10 | William Valor; Venezuela | 6951 | 761; 11.46 s w:+0.1 | 729; 6.64 m w:+0.1 | 659; 12.86 m | 705; 1.89 m | 765; 51.08 s | 816; 15.28 s w:-0.1 | 601; 36.87 m | 617; 4.00 m | 708; 58.00 m | 590; 4:54.80 min |
| 11 | Leandro López; Dominican Republic | 6832 | 771; 11.41 s w:+0.2 | 790; 6.90 m w:+1.3 | 602; 11.92 m | 577; 1.74 m | 789; 50.56 s | 723; 16.09 s w:-0.5 | 595; 36.54 m | 617; 4.00 m | 725; 59.15 m | 643; 4:46.00 min |
| 12 | Tyler Koskenoja; Canada | 6718 | 699; 11.76 s w:+0.2 | 670; 6.38 m w:+0.3 | 600; 11.90 m | 627; 1.80 m | 722; 52.07 s | 749; 15.86 s w:-0.3 | 643; 38.93 m | 617; 4.00 m | 674; 55.76 m | 717; 4:34.20 min |
| 13 | Marcus Cunningham; Canada | 6587 | 730; 11.61 s w:+0.1 | 807; 6.97 m w:+1.3 | 588; 11.70 m | 627; 1.80 m | 812; 50.06 s | 817; 15.27 s w:-0.5 | 609; 37.27 m | 562; 3.80 m | 400; 37.07 m | 635; 4:47.30 min |
| 14 | Francisco da Silva; Brazil | 6315 | 878; 10.92 s w:+0.2 | 845; 7.13 m w:+0.1 | 543; 10.95 m | 653; 1.83 m | 0 DNF | 818; 15.26 s w:-0.1 | 519; 32.76 m | 790; 4.60 m | 635; 53.12 m | 634; 4:47.40 min |
| 15 | Jamie Adjetey-Nelson; Canada | 6239 | 852; 11.04 s w:+0.2 | 910; 7.40 m w:+0.0 | 723; 13.92 m | 785; 1.98 m | 775; 50.86 s | 837; 15.10 s w:-0.1 | 737; 43.56 m | 0 NM | 620; 52.12 m | 0 DNF |
| 16 | Juan Gilberto Alcázar; Cuba - B | 6225 | 695; 11.78 s w:+0.2 | 795; 6.92 m w:+0.1 | 582; 11.60 m | 731; 1.92 m | 799; 50.35 s | 777; 15.61 s w:-0.1 | 532; 33.40 m | 0 NM | 590; 50.12 m | 724; 4:33.20 min |
| 17 | Gamalier Semeis; Dominican Republic | 5732 | 740; 11.56 s w:+0.1 | 688; 6.46 m w:+0.2 | 655; 12.80 m | 758; 1.95 m | 594; 55.11 s | 641; 16.84 s w:-0.3 | 580; 35.79 m | 0 NM | 483; 42.80 m | 593; 4:54.30 min |
| DNS | Chris Randolph; United States | | | | | | | | | | | |

=== Women's Heptathlon ===
Key

The highest mark recorded in each event is highlighted in yellow

| Rank | Athlete | Overall points | 100 m H | HJ | SP | 200 m | LJ | JT | 800 m |
|---|---|---|---|---|---|---|---|---|---|
| 1st place, gold medalist(s) | Sharon Day-Monroe; United States | 6063 CR | 938; 14.29 s w:+0.1 | 1145; 1.93 m | 722; 12.92 m | 899; 24.87 s w:-0.5 | 825; 5.92 m w:+0.5 | 671; 40.19 m | 863; 2:17.16 min |
| 2nd place, silver medalist(s) | Yarianny Argüelles; Cuba | 5982 | 964; 14.10 s w:+1.2 | 1067; 1.87 m | 637; 11.63 m | 951; 24.31 s w:-0.5 | 997; 6.47 m w:+1.8 | 628; 37.95 m | 738; 2:26.48 min |
| 3rd place, bronze medalist(s) | Lela Nelson; United States | 5817 | 993; 13.90 s w:+1.2 | 916; 1.75 m | 652; 11.86 m | 934; 24.49 s w:+0.0 | 934; 6.27 m w:+0.2 | 651; 39.14 m | 737; 2:26.55 min |
| 4 | Gretchen Quintana; Cuba | 5708 | 977; 14.01 s w:+1.2 | 806; 1.66 m | 738; 13.16 m | 916; 24.68 s w:-0.5 | 831; 5.94 m w:+1.2 | 627; 37.88 m | 813; 2:20.75 min |
| 5 | Yudalis Limonta; Cuba | 5235 | 929; 14.35 s w:+0.1 | 991; 1.81 m | 666; 12.08 m | 771; 26.30 s w:+0.0 | 908; 6.19 m w:+1.1 | 352; 23.40 m | 618; 2:36.12 min |
| 6 | Ashley Wilhelm; United States | 5153 | 863; 14.84 s w:+0.1 | 879; 1.72 m | 533; 10.06 m | 807; 25.89 s w:-0.5 | 732; 5.61 m w:+1.2 | 616; 37.34 m | 723; 2:27.59 min |
| 7 | Lisandra Carrion; Cuba - B | 5143 | 835; 15.05 s w:+1.2 | 736; 1.60 m | 676; 12.22 m | 772; 26.29 s w:-0.5 | 726; 5.59 m w:+1.5 | 669; 40.10 m | 729; 2:27.19 min |
| 8 | Francia Manzanillo; Puerto Rico | 4982 | 850; 14.94 s w:+1.2 | 666; 1.54 m | 641; 11.69 m | 802; 25.95 s w:-0.5 | 620; 5.22 m w:+1.2 | 667; 39.98 m | 736; 2:26.60 min |
| 9 | Jen Cotten; Canada | 4891 | 910; 14.49 s w:+1.2 | 771; 1.63 m | 459; 8.92 m | 837; 25.55 s w:+0.0 | 715; 5.55 m w:+1.6 | 323; 21.82 m | 876; 2:16.17 min |
| 10 | Anaima Fernández; Cuba - B | 4850 | 843; 14.99 s w:+0.1 | 806; 1.66 m | 531; 10.03 m | 760; 26.43 s w:+0.0 | 559; 5.00 m w:+1.1 | 571; 34.96 m | 780; 2:23.23 min |
| 11 | Coralys Ortiz; Puerto Rico | 4804 | 901; 14.56 s w:+0.1 | 666; 1.54 m | 717; 12.84 m | 759; 26.44 s w:-0.5 | 614; 5.20 m w:+1.0 | 774; 45.52 m | 373; 2:59.18 min |
| 12 | Karine Farias; Brazil | 4673 | 733; 15.85 s w:+1.2 | 701; 1.57 m | 606; 11.16 m | 709; 27.03 s w:+0.0 | 592; 5.12 m w:+0.3 | 554; 34.10 m | 778; 2:23.43 min |
| 13 | Chelsea Valois; Canada | 4492 | 767; 15.58 s w:+0.1 | 736; 1.60 m | 538; 10.13 m | 730; 26.78 s w:-0.5 | 620; 5.22 m w:+0.5 | 445; 28.31 m | 656; 2:32.99 min |
| DNF | Juana Castillo; Dominican Republic | 4035 | 781; 15.47 s w:+0.1 | 666; 1.54 m | 666; 12.07 m | 658; 27.66 s w:+0.0 | 640; 5.29 m w:+0.5 | 624; 37.76 m | DNS |
| DNF | Yalitza Rivera; Puerto Rico | | 0 DNF w:+1.2 | DNS | | | | | |
| DNS | Macarena Reyes; Chile | | | | | | | | |

== Participation ==
An unofficial count yields the participation of 32 athletes from 7 countries. Cuba entered with two teams (A and B). The announced athlete from Chile did not show.

- Brazil (2)
- Canada (5)
- Cuba (6 A / 5 B)
- Dominican Republic (3)
- Puerto Rico (5)
- United States (5)
- Venezuela (1)

== See also ==
- 2009 in athletics (track and field)
