= 2007 NACAC Combined Events Championships =

- Organisers: NACAC
- Edition: 3rd
- Date: May 26–27
- Host city: Santo Domingo, Dominican Republic
- Venue: Estadio Olímpico Félix Sánchez
- Participation: 27 athletes from 10 nations

The 2007 NACAC Combined Events Championships were held in Santo Domingo, Dominican Republic, at the Estadio Olímpico Félix Sánchez on May 26–27, 2007. A detailed report on the event and an appraisal of the results was given.

Complete results were published.

== Medallists ==
| Event | Gold | | Silver | | Bronze | |
|---|---|---|---|---|---|---|
| Men's Decathlon | Ryan Harlan; United States | 7901 | Leonel Suárez; Cuba | 7843 | Yunior Díaz; Cuba | 7816 |
| Women's Heptathlon | Gretchen Quintana; Cuba | 6007 | Fiona Asigbee; United States | 5770 | Lela Nelson; United States | 5760 |

== Results ==
=== Men's Decathlon ===
Key

The highest mark recorded in each event is highlighted in yellow

| Rank | Athlete | Overall points | 100 m | LJ | SP | HJ | 400 m | 110 m H | DT | PV | JT | 1500 m |
|---|---|---|---|---|---|---|---|---|---|---|---|---|
| 1st place, gold medalist(s) | Ryan Harlan; United States | 7901 | 821; 11.18 s w:-2.5 | 854; 7.17 m w:+2.3 | 875; 16.38 m | 859; 2.06 m | 816; 49.97 s | 929; 14.36 s w:-0.2 | 735; 43.45 m | 849; 4.80 m | 697; 57.31 m | 466; 5:17.00 min |
| 2nd place, silver medalist(s) | Leonel Suárez; Cuba | 7843 | 778; 11.38 s w:-2.5 | 869; 7.23 m w:+2.0 | 605; 11.97 m | 915; 2.12 m | 843; 49.38 s | 862; 14.90 s w:-0.2 | 658; 39.70 m | 731; 4.40 m | 813; 65.01 m | 769; 4:26.32 min |
| 3rd place, bronze medalist(s) | Yunior Díaz; Cuba | 7816 | 878; 10.92 s w:-2.5 | 992; 7.73 m w:+2.8 | 766; 14.61 m | 723; 1.91 m | 927; 47.64 s | 845; 15.04 s w:-0.2 | 672; 40.38 m | 617; 4.00 m | 652; 54.29 m | 744; 4:30.16 min |
| 4 | Chris Boyles; United States | 7791 | 774; 11.40 s w:-2.0 | 876; 7.26 m w:+2.4 | 746; 14.29 m | 859; 2.06 m | 772; 50.94 s | 882; 14.73 s w:-0.2 | 755; 44.44 m | 819; 4.70 m | 704; 57.76 m | 604; 4:52.52 min |
| 5 | Paul Terek; United States | 7609 | 784; 11.35 s w:-2.5 | 833; 7.08 m w:+0.3 | 738; 14.16 m | 723; 1.91 m | 765; 51.09 s | 776; 15.62 s w:-0.2 | 804; 46.79 m | 941; 5.10 m | 629; 52.73 m | 616; 4:50.42 min |
| 6 | Carlos Chinin; Brazil | 7416 | 863; 10.99 s w:-2.5 | 891; 7.32 m w:+0.4 | 643; 12.61 m | 831; 2.03 m | 876; 48.70 s | 890; 14.67 s w:-0.2 | 608; 37.20 m | 617; 4.00 m | 559; 47.97 m | 638; 4:46.77 min |
| 7 | Craig Slaunwhite; Canada | 7295 | 699; 11.76 s w:-2.0 | 804; 6.96 m w:+2.0 | 855; 16.06 m | 776; 1.97 m | 663; 53.45 s | 744; 15.90 s w:-1.3 | 796; 46.43 m | 702; 4.30 m | 689; 56.76 m | 567; 4:58.76 min |
| 8 | Steven Marrero; Puerto Rico | 6861 | 730; 11.61 s w:-2.0 | 807; 6.97 m w:+0.9 | 707; 13.65 m | 644; 1.82 m | 770; 50.97 s | 519; 18.05 s w:-1.3 | 732; 43.31 m | 760; 4.50 m | 611; 51.53 m | 581; 4:56.27 min |
| 9 | Andrés Horacio Mantilla; Colombia | 6764 | 746; 11.53 s w:-2.0 | 691; 6.47 m w:+1.5 | 689; 13.35 m | 723; 1.91 m | 687; 52.88 s | 801; 15.41 s w:-0.2 | 706; 42.05 m | 617; 4.00 m | 574; 49.00 m | 530; 5:05.16 min |
| 10 | Alberto Juantorena Jr. Cuba | 6716 | 841; 11.09 s w:-2.0 | 878; 7.27 m w:+1.8 | 697; 13.48 m | 887; 2.09 m | 777; 50.82 s | 823; 15.22 s w:-1.3 | 684; 40.98 m | 0 NM m | 576; 49.15 m | 553; 5:01.13 min |
| 11 | Gamalier Semeis; Dominican Republic | 5970 | 753; 11.50 s w:-2.5 | 697; 6.50 m w:+1.1 | 622; 12.26 m | 670; 1.85 m | 615; 54.61 s | 543; 17.80 s w:-1.3 | 491; 31.35 m | 535; 3.70 m | 528; 45.86 m | 516; 5:07.72 min |
| 12 | Danny Paredes; Dominican Republic | 5575 | 693; 11.79 s w:-2.0 | 615; 6.13 m w:+0.4 | 514; 10.47 m | 496; 1.64 m | 672; 53.22 s | 660; 16.66 s w:-1.3 | 436; 28.54 m | 406; 3.20 m | 528; 45.86 m | 555; 5:00.80 min |
| DNF | Clifford Caines; Canada | 4664 | 769; 11.42 s w:-2.5 | 823; 7.04 m w:+2.1 | 742; 14.22 m | 723; 1.91 m | 792; 50.50 s | 815; 15.29 s w:-1.3 | 0 NM | DNS | | |
| DNF | Octavius Gillespie; Guatemala | 4201 | 691; 11.80 s w:-2.0 | 727; 6.63 m w:+1.2 | 656; 12.81 m | 776; 1.97 m | 0 DNF | 696; 16.33 s w:-1.3 | 655; 39.53 m | DNS | | |
| DNF | Julio Gloria; Dominican Republic | 4019 | 699; 11.76 s w:-2.5 | 661; 6.34 m w:+0.5 | 523; 10.62 m | 569; 1.73 m | 571; 55.71 s | 503; 18.22 s w:-1.3 | 493; 31.45 m | 0 NM | DNS | |
| DNF | Edson Bindilatti; Brazil | 2996 | 761; 11.46 s w:-2.0 | 823; 7.04 m w:0.0 | 636; 12.48 m | 776; 1.97 m | 0 DNF | DNS | | | | |

=== Women's Heptathlon ===
Key

The highest mark recorded in each event is highlighted in yellow

| Rank | Athlete | Overall points | 100 m H | HJ | SP | 200 m | LJ | JT | 800 m |
|---|---|---|---|---|---|---|---|---|---|
| 1st place, gold medalist(s) | Gretchen Quintana; Cuba | 6007 CR | 1033; 13.62 s w:+1.6 | 891; 1.73 m | 742; 13.22 m | 965; 24.16 s w:-1.1 | 918; 6.22 m w:+1.8 | 576; 35.25 m | 882; 2:15.76 min |
| 2nd place, silver medalist(s) | Fiona Asigbee; United States | 5770 | 1028; 13.65 s w:+1.6 | 1003; 1.82 m | 664; 12.05 m | 869; 25.20 s w:-1.1 | 874; 6.08 m w:+2.3 | 578; 35.33 m | 754; 2:25.23 min |
| 3rd place, bronze medalist(s) | Lela Nelson; United States | 5760 | 1005; 13.81 s w:+1.6 | 1003; 1.82 m | 598; 11.05 m | 925; 24.59 s w:-1.1 | 921; 6.23 m w:+0.9 | 558; 34.31 m | 750; 2:25.54 min |
| 4 | Yasmiany Pedroso; Cuba | 5754 | 966; 14.09 s w:+1.6 | 891; 1.73 m | 748; 13.31 m | 833; 25.59 s w:-1.8 | 843; 5.98 m w:+0.3 | 696; 41.51 m | 777; 2:23.44 min |
| 5 | Juana Castillo; Dominican Republic | 5741 | 987; 13.94 s w:+1.6 | 855; 1.70 m | 733; 13.08 m | 858; 25.32 s w:-1.1 | 717; 5.56 m w:+0.5 | 721; 42.79 m | 870; 2:16.64 min |
| 6 | Yalitza Rivera; Puerto Rico | 5462 | 963; 14.11 s w:+0.1 | 855; 1.70 m | 608; 11.20 m | 841; 25.50 s w:-1.1 | 789; 5.80 m w:+1.1 | 622; 37.66 m | 784; 2:22.96 min |
| 7 | Jackie Poulson; United States | 5273 | 875; 14.75 s w:+1.6 | 644; 1.52 m | 709; 12.72 m | 778; 26.22 s w:-1.1 | 741; 5.64 m w:+1.0 | 771; 45.39 m | 755; 2:25.13 min |
| 8 | Francia Manzanillo; Puerto Rico | 5223 | 935; 14.31 s w:+0.1 | 610; 1.49 m | 660; 11.98 m | 841; 25.51 s w:-1.8 | 660; 5.36 m w:+1.7 | 685; 40.92 m | 832; 2:19.36 min |
| 9 | Mariana Abuela; Mexico | 4987 | 828; 15.10 s w:+0.1 | 783; 1.64 m | 539; 10.14 m | 744; 26.62 s w:-1.8 | 694; 5.48 m w:+0.6 | 580; 35.43 m | 819; 2:20.35 min |
| 10 | Nouryn Mota; Dominican Republic | 4090 | 775; 15.51 s w:+0.1 | 644; 1.52 m | 520; 9.85 m | 595; 28.46 s w:-1.8 | 587; 5.10 m w:+1.5 | 587; 35.83 m | 382; 2:58.18 min |
| DNF | María Gabriela Carrillo; El Salvador | 2846 | 720; 15.95 s w:+0.1 | 610; 1.49 m | 502; 9.58 m | 0 DNF w:-1.8 | 433; 4.52 m w:+1.0 | 581; 35.50 m | DNS |

== Participation ==
An unofficial count yields the participation of 27 athletes from 10 countries.

- Brazil (2)
- Canada (2)
- Colombia (1)
- Cuba (5)
- Dominican Republic (5)
- El Salvador (1)
- Guatemala (1)
- Mexico (1)
- Puerto Rico (3)
- United States (6)

== See also ==
- 2007 in athletics (track and field)
