= 2006 NACAC Combined Events Championships =

- Organisers: NACAC
- Edition: 2nd
- Date: August 25–26
- Host city: San Juan, Puerto Rico
- Venue: Estadio Sixto Escobar
- Participation: 15 athletes from 6 nations

The 2006 NACAC Combined Events Championships were held in San Juan, Puerto Rico, at the Estadio Sixto Escobar on August 25–26, 2006. A detailed report on the event and an appraisal of the results was given.

Complete results were published.

== Medallists ==
Event	Gold		Silver		Bronze	
Men's Decathlon	Ryan Harlan; United States	7966	Paul Terek; United States	7884	Chris Boyles; United States	7703
Women's Heptathlon	Virginia Johnson; United States	5991	Hyleas Fountain; United States	5956	Fiona Asigbee; United States	5779

== Results ==
=== Men's Decathlon ===
Key

The highest mark recorded in each event is highlighted in yellow

Rank	Athlete	Overall points	100 m	LJ	SP	HJ	400 m	110 m H	DT	PV	JT	1500 m
1st place, gold medalist(s)	Ryan Harlan; United States	7966	874; 10.94 s w:+2.9	748; 6.72 m w:+2.9	852; 16.02 m	896; 2.10 m	790; 50.54 s	953; 14.17 s w:+1.1	720; 42.74 m	849; 4.80 m	732; 59.64 m	552; 5:01.37 min
2nd place, silver medalist(s)	Paul Terek; United States	7884	858; 11.01 s w:+2.9	809; 6.98 m w:+3.1	778; 14.81 m	785; 1.98 m	853; 49.18 s	803; 15.39 s w:+1.1	794; 46.30 m	880; 4.90 m	643; 53.67 m	681; 4:39.95 min
3rd place, bronze medalist(s)	Chris Boyles; United States	7703	799; 11.28 s w:+2.9	783; 6.87 m w:+3.2	763; 14.57 m	868; 2.07 m	757; 51.26 s	863; 14.89 s w:+1.1	748; 44.06 m	790; 4.60 m	750; 60.84 m	582; 4:56.18 min
4	Massimo Bertocchi; Canada	7147	847; 11.06 s w:+2.9	795; 6.92 m w:+3.6	622; 12.25 m	731; 1.92 m	769; 51.00 s	896; 14.62 s w:+1.1	625; 38.05 m	790; 4.60 m	520; 45.31 m	552; 5:01.26 min
5	Andrés Horacio Mantilla; Colombia	6891	791; 11.32 s w:+2.9	632; 6.21 m w:+3.3	641; 12.57 m	731; 1.92 m	729; 51.91 s	860; 14.91 s w:+1.1	701; 41.80 m	562; 3.80 m	589; 50.01 m	655; 4:44.09 min
6	James Holder; Canada	6807	786; 11.34 s w:+2.9	718; 6.59 m w:+3.4	620; 12.23 m	653; 1.83 m	763; 51.14 s	842; 15.06 s w:+1.1	599; 36.77 m	617; 4.00 m	537; 46.52 m	672; 4:41.29 min

=== Women's Heptathlon ===
Key

The highest mark recorded in each event is highlighted in yellow

Rank	Athlete	Overall points	100 m H	HJ	SP	200 m	LJ	JT	800 m
1st place, gold medalist(s)	Virginia Johnson; United States	5991 CR	1100; 13.16 s w:+3.4	818; 1.67 m	716; 12.83 m	989; 23.91 s w:+1.7	880; 6.10 m w:+1.3	640; 38.56 m	848; 2:18.24 min
2nd place, silver medalist(s)	Hyleas Fountain; United States	5956	1055; 13.47 s w:+3.4	966; 1.79 m	631; 11.54 m	945; 24.37 s w:+1.7	985; 6.43 m w:+1.2	648; 39.00 m	726; 2:27.39 min
3rd place, bronze medalist(s)	Fiona Asigbee; United States	5779	1041; 13.56 s w:+3.4	928; 1.76 m	727; 13.00 m	887; 25.00 s w:+1.7	810; 5.87 m w:+1.6	575; 35.15 m	811; 2:20.89 min
4	Juana Castillo; Dominican Republic	5581	921; 14.41 s w:+3.4	818; 1.67 m	713; 12.78 m	849; 25.42 s w:+1.7	753; 5.68 m w:+3.0	693; 41.36 m	834; 2:19.24 min
5	Susan Coltman; Canada	5289	888; 14.65 s w:+3.1	855; 1.70 m	651; 11.85 m	824; 25.69 s w:+1.7	735; 5.62 m w:+1.5	567; 34.75 m	769; 2:24.04 min
6	Flor María Robledo; Colombia	4815	799; 15.33 s w:+3.1	644; 1.52 m	553; 10.36 m	792; 26.06 s w:+2.3	573; 5.05 m w:+2.6	685; 40.93 m	769; 2:24.09 min
7	Yalitza Rivera; Puerto Rico	4716	894; 14.61 s w:+3.4	747; 1.61 m	577; 10.72 m	794; 26.04 s w:+2.3	527; 4.88 m w:+2.8	492; 30.82 m	685; 2:30.59 min
8	Trish Palmer; Canada	4291	779; 15.48 s w:+3.1	577; 1.46 m	608; 11.20 m	796; 26.01 s w:+2.3	0 NM	753; 44.46 m	778; 2:23.40 min
9	Mariana Abuela; Mexico	3989	685; 16.24 s w:+3.1	610; 1.49 m	475; 9.17 m	625; 28.08 s w:+2.3	441; 4.55 m w:+1.5	524; 32.51 m	629; 2:35.25 min

== Participation ==
An unofficial count yields the participation of 15 athletes from 6 countries.

- Canada (4)
- Colombia (2)
- Dominican Republic (1)
- Mexico (1)
- Puerto Rico (1)
- United States (6)

== See also ==
- 2006 in athletics (track and field)
