= 2008 Pan American Combined Events Championships =

- Organisers: NACAC
- Edition: 4th
- Date: May 31 – June 1, 2008
- Host city: Santo Domingo, Dominican Republic
- Venue: Estadio Olímpico Félix Sánchez
- Participation: 41 athletes from 15 nations

The 2008 Pan American Combined Events Championships were held in Santo Domingo, Dominican Republic, at the Estadio Olímpico Félix Sánchez on May 31 – June 1, 2008. A detailed report on the event and an appraisal of the results was given.

Complete results were published.

== Medallists ==
Event	Gold		Silver		Bronze	
Men's Decathlon	Chris Helwick; United States	7820	Iván Scolfaro da Silva; Brazil	7783	Chris Randolph; United States	7747
Women's Heptathlon	Lela Nelson; United States	5944	Ryanne Dupree; United States	5704	Yasmiany Pedroso; Cuba	5659

== Results ==
=== Men's Decathlon ===
Key

The highest mark recorded in each event is highlighted in yellow

Rank	Athlete	Overall points	100 m	LJ	SP	HJ	400 m	110 m H	DT	PV	JT	1500 m
1st place, gold medalist(s)	Chris Helwick; United States	7820	814; 11.21 s w:+2.1	862; 7.20 m w:+3.0	697; 13.49 m	776; 1.97 m	799; 50.35 s	835; 15.12 s w:+0.5	731; 43.26 m	849; 4.80 m	663; 54.98 m	794; 4:22.60 min
2nd place, silver medalist(s)	Iván Scolfaro da Silva; Brazil	7783	827; 11.15 s w:+1.9	864; 7.21 m w:+1.8	695; 13.45 m	776; 1.97 m	795; 50.43 s	873; 14.81 s w:+1.4	674; 40.45 m	819; 4.70 m	712; 58.25 m	748; 4:29.45 min
3rd place, bronze medalist(s)	Chris Randolph; United States	7747	804; 11.26 s w:+1.9	828; 7.06 m w:+0.3	728; 14.00 m	776; 1.97 m	841; 49.44 s	792; 15.48 s w:+1.4	716; 42.54 m	790; 4.60 m	720; 58.83 m	752; 4:28.88 min
4	Luiz Alberto de Araújo; Brazil	7733	938; 10.66 s w:+1.9	905; 7.38 m w:+2.0	697; 13.49 m	696; 1.88 m	836; 49.54 s	936; 14.30 s w:+1.4	701; 41.81 m	673; 4.20 m	622; 52.23 m	729; 4:32.38 min
5	Jamie Adjetey-Nelson; Canada	7728	929; 10.70 s w:+1.9	972; 7.65 m w:+2.0	736; 14.12 m	723; 1.91 m	810; 50.09 s	853; 14.97 s w:+0.5	688; 41.17 m	731; 4.40 m	691; 56.87 m	595; 4:53.91 min
6	Chris Boyles; United States	7650	804; 11.26 s w:+1.9	893; 7.33 m w:+1.6	778; 14.81 m	749; 1.94 m	768; 51.02 s	865; 14.87 s w:+1.4	739; 43.63 m	731; 4.40 m	726; 59.21 m	597; 4:53.67 min
7	Odirlei Carlos Pessoni; Brazil	7568	899; 10.83 s w:+1.9	723; 6.61 m w:+0.9	757; 14.46 m	749; 1.94 m	822; 49.85 s	842; 15.06 s w:+1.4	783; 45.76 m	731; 4.40 m	696; 57.24 m	566; 4:58.92 min
8	Andrés Horacio Mantilla; Colombia	7340	858; 11.01 s w:+1.9	778; 6.85 m w:+0.1	681; 13.22 m	803; 2.00 m	703; 52.50 s	880; 14.75 s w:+1.4	710; 42.21 m	702; 4.30 m	621; 52.17 m	604; 4:52.44 min
9	Clifford Caines; Canada	7261	769; 11.42 s w:+2.1	792; 6.91 m w:+1.4	744; 14.26 m	776; 1.97 m	744; 51.56 s	755; 15.80 s w:+0.5	639; 38.75 m	617; 4.00 m	649; 54.08 m	776; 4:25.30 min
10	Steven Marrero; Puerto Rico	7148	797; 11.29 s w:+1.2	835; 7.09 m w:+0.4	717; 13.82 m	644; 1.82 m	787; 50.60 s	661; 16.65 s w:+1.3	758; 44.56 m	702; 4.30 m	624; 52.41 m	623; 4:49.26 min
11	Marcos Sánchez-Valle; Puerto Rico	7083	874; 10.94 s w:+2.1	755; 6.75 m w:+1.3	708; 13.67 m	670; 1.85 m	821; 49.87 s	772; 15.66 s w:+1.3	713; 42.40 m	673; 4.20 m	587; 49.86 m	510; 5:08.89 min
12	Craig Slaunwhite; Canada	7060	746; 11.53 s w:+1.2	764; 6.79 m w:+1.0	769; 14.66 m	776; 1.97 m	658; 53.56 s	734; 15.99 s w:+1.3	809; 47.02 m	790; 4.60 m	615; 51.79 m	399; 5:30.16 min
13	Kurt Felix; Grenada	6946	771; 11.41 s w:+1.2	869; 7.23 m w:+1.2	612; 12.10 m	749; 1.94 m	748; 51.48 s	673; 16.54 s w:+1.3	560; 34.83 m	482; 3.50 m	828; 65.94 m	654; 4:44.23 min
14	Octavius Gillespie; Guatemala	6887	705; 11.73 s w:+2.1	850; 7.15 m w:+1.4	664; 12.94 m	776; 1.97 m	592; 55.17 s	774; 15.64 s w:+0.5	695; 41.51 m	645; 4.10 m	685; 56.46 m	501; 5:10.46 min
15	Darwin Colón; Honduras	6590 NR	841; 11.09 s w:+2.1	739; 6.68 m w:+0.4	636; 12.48 m	696; 1.88 m	695; 52.69 s	853; 14.97 s w:+0.5	637; 38.63 m	509; 3.60 m	455; 40.88 m	529; 5:05.42 min
16	Leandro López; Dominican Republic	6483	774; 11.40 s w:+1.2	707; 6.54 m w:+1.6	600; 11.90 m	593; 1.76 m	714; 52.24 s	751; 15.84 s w:+0.5	515; 32.57 m	535; 3.70 m	651; 54.22 m	643; 4:45.99 min
17	Darío Villafañe; Argentina	5907	823; 11.17 s w:+2.1	774; 6.83 m w:+1.5	500; 10.24 m	569; 1.73 m	818; 49.92 s	762; 15.74 s w:+1.3	525; 33.07 m	0 NM	453; 40.77 m	683; 4:39.52 min
DNF	Julio Gloria; Dominican Republic	4049	750; 11.51 s w:+1.2	630; 6.20 m w:+0.2	556; 11.17 m	569; 1.73 m	463; 58.56 s	597; 17.26 s w:+0.5	484; 30.97 m	DNS		
DNF	Alexis Chivás; Cuba	3919	812; 11.22 s w:+2.1	871; 7.24 m w:+1.3	0 NM	776; 1.97 m	608; 54.77 s	0 DNF w:+1.4	852; 49.11 m	0 NM	DNS	
DNF	William Alexander Valor; Venezuela	2604	810; 11.23 s w:+1.9	576; 5.95 m w:+1.9	674; 13.11 m	544; 1.70 m	0 DNS	DNS				
DNF	Julián Zárate; Mexico	2533	742; 11.55 s w:+1.2	628; 6.19 m w:+1.1	619; 12.21 m	544; 1.70 m	0 DNS	DNS				

=== Women's Heptathlon ===
Key

The highest mark recorded in each event is highlighted in yellow

Rank	Athlete	Overall points	100 m H	HJ	SP	200 m	LJ	JT	800 m
1st place, gold medalist(s)	Lela Nelson; United States	5944	1028; 13.65 s w:+2.5	928; 1.76 m	676; 12.22 m	936; 24.47 s w:+1.1	991; 6.45 m w:+0.5	602; 36.58 m	783; 2:23.02 min
2nd place, silver medalist(s)	Ryanne Dupree; United States	5704	1056; 13.46 s w:+2.5	855; 1.70 m	676; 12.22 m	898; 24.88 s w:+1.1	877; 6.09 m w:+0.1	616; 37.33 m	726; 2:27.35 min
3rd place, bronze medalist(s)	Yasmiany Pedroso; Cuba	5659	980; 13.99 s w:+2.5	928; 1.76 m	746; 13.28 m	816; 25.79 s w:+1.3	732; 5.61 m w:+0.2	741; 43.82 m	716; 2:28.20 min
4	Ashley Wilhelm; United States	5598	914; 14.46 s w:+2.5	891; 1.73 m	656; 11.93 m	869; 25.19 s w:+1.3	899; 6.16 m w:+3.3	628; 37.95 m	741; 2:26.24 min
5	Thaimara Rivas; Venezuela	5554	925; 14.38 s w:+1.4	783; 1.64 m	692; 12.46 m	817; 25.78 s w:+0.8	831; 5.94 m w:+2.5	709; 42.19 m	797; 2:21.97 min
6	Elizete da Silva; Brazil	5493	910; 14.49 s w:+1.4	783; 1.64 m	719; 12.88 m	858; 25.32 s w:+1.1	831; 5.94 m w:+0.9	628; 37.96 m	764; 2:24.43 min
7	Toni-Ann D'Oyley; Jamaica	5332	1065; 13.40 s w:+2.5	747; 1.61 m	735; 13.11 m	912; 24.73 s w:+1.1	843; 5.98 m w:+0.7	399; 25.88 m	631; 2:35.08 min
8	Francia Manzanillo; Dominican Republic	5241	929; 14.35 s w:+1.4	678; 1.55 m	654; 11.90 m	838; 25.54 s w:+1.3	663; 5.37 m w:+0.2	656; 39.40 m	823; 2:20.05 min
9	Ana Lorenzo; Dominican Republic	5146	966; 14.09 s w:+1.4	747; 1.61 m	578; 10.74 m	850; 25.40 s w:+1.3	631; 5.26 m w:-0.5	658; 39.52 m	716; 2:28.20 min
10	Jennifer Cotten; Canada	5139	943; 14.25 s w:+1.4	783; 1.64 m	483; 9.29 m	827; 25.66 s w:+1.3	723; 5.58 m w:+1.8	460; 29.13 m	920; 2:13.05 min
11	Flor María Robledo; Colombia	5035	903; 14.54 s w:+2.5	644; 1.52 m	702; 12.62 m	780; 26.20 s w:+1.1	598; 5.14 m w:+0.6	640; 38.58 m	768; 2:24.17 min
12	Ana Camila Pirelli; Paraguay	4940	810; 15.24 s w:+2.0	678; 1.55 m	647; 11.79 m	797; 26.00 s w:+0.8	671; 5.40 m w:0.0	578; 35.31 m	759; 2:24.82 min
13	Mariana Abuela; Mexico	4924	847; 14.96 s w:+2.0	747; 1.61 m	524; 9.92 m	713; 26.98 s w:+0.8	609; 5.18 m w:+0.7	630; 38.03 m	854; 2:17.80 min
14	Karine Farias; Brazil	4902	792; 15.38 s w:+2.0	712; 1.58 m	608; 11.20 m	752; 26.52 s w:+1.3	688; 5.46 m w:+1.1	590; 35.96 m	760; 2:24.76 min
15	Nahomi Rivera; Puerto Rico	4810	756; 15.66 s w:+2.0	747; 1.61 m	595; 11.00 m	720; 26.90 s w:+0.8	686; 5.45 m w:+0.9	661; 39.69 m	645; 2:33.90 min
16	Yone Abuin; Mexico	4733	791; 15.39 s w:+2.0	747; 1.61 m	462; 8.97 m	757; 26.46 s w:+0.8	609; 5.18 m w:0.0	503; 31.40 m	864; 2:17.04 min
17	Peaches Roach; Jamaica	4677	995; 13.88 s w:+2.5	966; 1.79 m	490; 9.39 m	971; 24.10 s w:+1.1	853; 6.01 m w:+0.5	402; 26.07 m	0 DQ
18	Nairobi Michel; Dominican Republic	4438	827; 15.11 s w:+2.0	610; 1.49 m	564; 10.52 m	669; 27.52 s w:+0.8	686; 5.45 m w:+0.1	622; 37.65 m	460; 2:50.32 min
19	Colleen Felix; Grenada	3859 NR NRj	166; 21.87 s w:+1.4	712; 1.58 m	654; 11.90 m	798; 25.99 s w:+1.1	631; 5.26 m w:+1.0	595; 36.23 m	303; 3:06.93 min
DNF	Melry Caldeira; Brazil	3150	990; 13.92 s w:+2.5	644; 1.52 m	687; 12.39 m	829; 25.64 s w:+1.1	0 NM	DNS	

== Participation ==
An unofficial count yields the participation of 41 athletes from 15 countries.

- Argentina (1)
- Brazil (6)
- Canada (4)
- Colombia (2)
- Cuba (2)
- Dominican Republic (5)
- Grenada (2)
- Guatemala (1)
- Honduras (1)
- Jamaica (2)
- Mexico (3)
- Paraguay (1)
- Puerto Rico (3)
- United States (6)
- Venezuela (2)

== See also ==
- 2008 in athletics (track and field)
