= Yordanis García =

Cuban decathlete (born 1988)

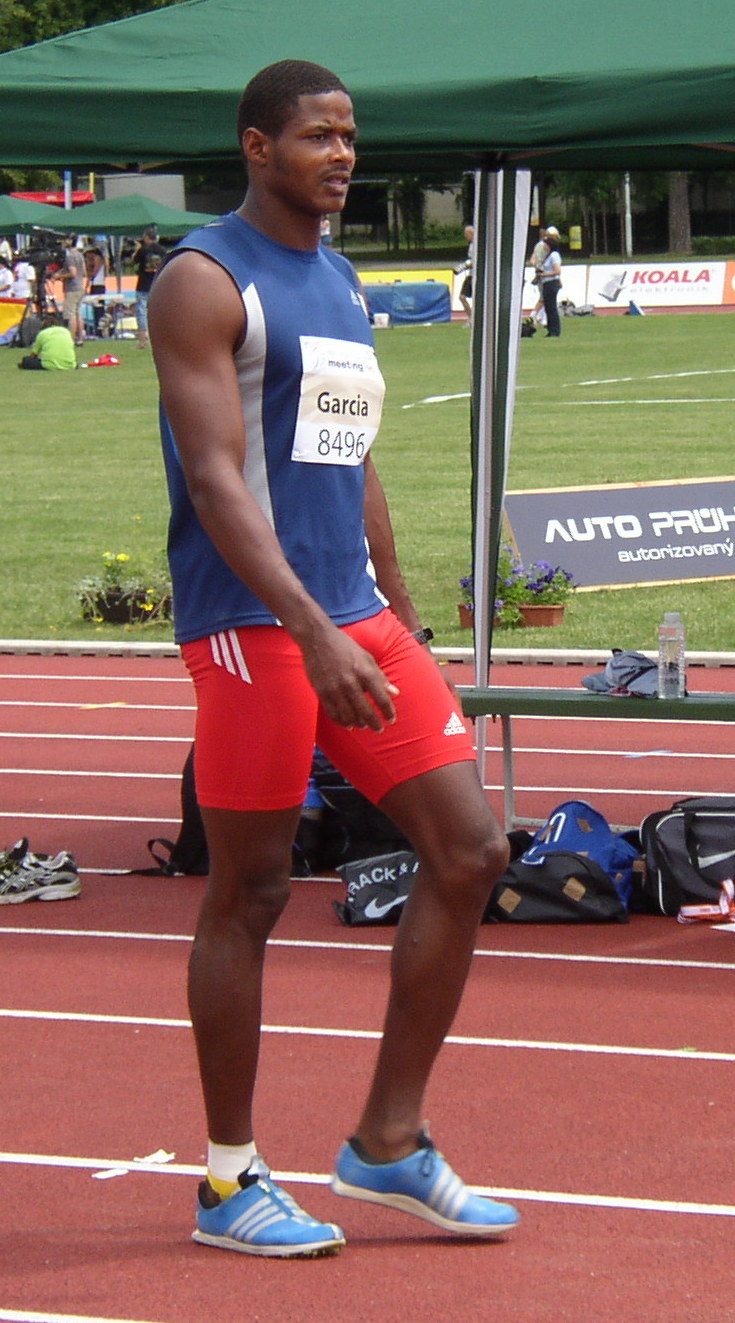
- García at the 2011 TNT – Fortuna Meeting in Kladno

Personal information
- Full name: Yordanis García Barrisonte
- Born: November 21, 1988 (age 37) San Juan y Martínez, Cuba
- Height: 1.88 m (6 ft 2 in)
- Weight: 80 kg (176 lb)

Sport
- Country: Cuba
- Sport: Athletics
- Updated on 28 December 2014

Yordanis García Barrisonte (Spanish pronunciation: [ʝoɾˈðanis ɣaɾˈsi.a βariˈsonte]; born November 21, 1988) is a Cuban decathlete who competed for his native country at the 2008 Beijing Olympics. The 2005 World Youth champion, he is a two-time medallist at the Pan American Games and has competed at the World Championships in Athletics on three occasions (2007, 2009, 2011). He is the nephew of Yenima Arencibia.

== Career ==
He had his first international success came at the age of sixteen at the 2005 World Youth Championships in Athletics. His winning score in the octathlon, 6482 points, was a new world youth record for the event. García had taken time to develop at the youth level but the Cuban combined events coach, Gabino Arzola, remained convinced that he would mature. Along with Leonel Suárez and Yunior Díaz, García was one of a young Cuban trio that Arzola hoped would gain selection for the 2012 London Olympics. In 2006, García became the Cuban decathlon champion and won a silver medal at the World Junior Championships behind Russian Arkadiy Vasilyev. His runner-up performance was achieved through personal bests in every event but the long jump, which resulted in a Cuban junior record of 7850 points.

García's first senior championship appearances came in 2007, in which he won a silver at the 2007 Pan American Games and took eighth place at the 2007 World Championships in Athletics with a personal best and Cuban record score of 8257 points. He went on to compete at the 2008 Beijing Olympics and just scraped below the 8000-point barrier by eight points, finishing in fifteenth overall. García's compatriot Leonel Suárez, on the other hand, had broken the national record with an 8527-point performance for the Olympic bronze medal. In 2009, García improved his personal best to 8496 points in Havana and went on to finish eighth at the 2009 World Championships in Athletics with 8387 points.

At the start of the outdoor season in 2010, he came third at the Multistars meeting then won at the Erdgas Meeting in Ratingen, Germany – outdoing Suárez with a season's best of 8288. Later that season on the European circuit, he managed fourth place with a total of 8174 points at the Décastar meeting in September – a contest won by his rival Suárez. He began 2011 with a season's best of 8397 points in Havana, but fared less well in Europe, dropping out of the Hypo Meeting and coming sixth with 8067 points at the TNT-Fortuna Meeting. He competed at the 2011 World Championships in Athletics, but dropped out for the second time that season after six events. Suárez topped the podium at the 2011 Pan American Games in October and García joined him with a bronze medal performance.

At the 2012 IAAF World Indoor Championships he came seventh in a small heptathlon field with a tally of 5704 points. He was seventh at the Hypo Meeting in May but improved to third place at the Mehrkampf-Meeting Ratingen a month later. He competed at the 2012 Summer Olympics, finishing in 14th place with a total of 7956 points.

He competed at the 2015 World Championships, but did not finish. At the 2016 Olympics, he finished in 18th place with 7961 points.

== Personal bests ==
=== Outdoor ===
Event	Performance	Location	Date
100 m	10.5 (ht)	Havana	9 May 2013
400 m	48.17 A	Xalapa	24 November 2014
1500 m	4:31.40	Havana	6 May 2011
110 m hurdles	13.89 (wind: +0.5 m/s)	Ratingen	21 June 2009
High jump	2.10m	Havana	29 May 2009
Pole vault	4.90m	Havana	20 March 2010
Long jump	7.36m (wind: +0.2 m/s)	Havana	29 May 2009
Shot put	16.50m	Havana	29 May 2009
Discus throw	47.70m	Havana	19 July 2008
Javelin throw	69.37m	Berlin	20 August 2009
Decathlon	8496 pts	Havana	30 May 2009

=== Indoor ===
Event	Performance	Location	Date
60 m	6.89	Tallinn	7 February 2009
1000 m	2:50.21	Istanbul	10 March 2012
60 m hurdles	7.80	Gothenburg	2 February 2010
High jump	2.08m	Sumy	17 February 2010
Pole vault	4.70m	Seville	22 February 2009
Long jump	6.99m	Tallinn	12 February 2010
Shot put	15.93m	Seville	21 February 2009
Heptathlon	5905 pts	Seville	21 February 2009

== Achievements ==
Year	Competition	Venue	Position	Event	Notes
Representing Cuba
2005	World Youth Championships	Marrakesh, Morocco	1st	Octathlon	6482 pts
2006	World Junior Championships	Beijing, China	2nd	Decathlon (junior)	7850 pts
2007	Pan American Games	Rio de Janeiro, Brazil	2nd	Decathlon	8113 pts
2007	World Championships	Osaka, Japan	8th	Decathlon	8257 pts
2008	Hypo-Meeting	Götzis, Austria	-	Decathlon	DNF
2008	Olympic Games	Beijing, China	15th	Decathlon	7992 pts
2009	Americas Combined Events Cup	Havana, Cuba	1st	Decathlon	8496 pts
2009	World Championships	Berlin, Germany	8th	Decathlon	8387 pts
2010	Hypo-Meeting	Götzis, Austria	18th	Decathlon	7479 pts
2011	World Championships	Daegu, South Korea	–	Decathlon	DNF
2011	Pan American Games	Guadalajara, Mexico	3rd	Decathlon	8074 pts
2012	World Indoor Championships	Istanbul, Turkey	7th	Heptathlon	5704 pts
2012	Olympic Games	London, United Kingdom	14th	Decathlon	7956 pts
2013	Pan American Combined Events Cup	Ottawa, Canada	1st	Decathlon	8141 pts
2014	Pan American Combined Events Cup	Ottawa, Canada	1st	Decathlon	8179 pts
2014	Central American and Caribbean Games	Xalapa, Mexico	1st	Decathlon	7854 pts A
2015	Pan American Combined Events Cup	Ottawa, Canada	1st	Decathlon	7977 pts
2015	Pan American Games	Toronto, Canada	5th	Decathlon	7919 pts
2015	World Championships	Beijing, China	—	Decathlon	DNF
2016	Olympic Games	Rio de Janeiro, Brazil	18th	Decathlon	7961 pts
