= 2005 NACAC Combined Events Championships =

- Organisers: NACAC
- Edition: 1st
- Date: May 28–29
- Host city: San Juan, Puerto Rico
- Venue: Estadio Sixto Escobar
- Participation: 28 athletes from 9 nations

The 2005 NACAC Combined Events Championships were held in San Juan, Puerto Rico, at the Estadio Sixto Escobar on May 28–29, 2005. A detailed report on the event and an appraisal of the results was given.

Complete results were published.

== Medallists ==
Event	Gold		Silver		Bronze	
Men's Decathlon	Maurice Smith; Jamaica	8232	Ryan Harlan; United States	7997	Paul Terek; United States	7923
Women's Heptathlon	Fiona Asigbee; United States	5868	Tracye Lawyer-Thomas; United States	5603	Jackie Poulson; United States	5499

== Results ==
=== Men's Decathlon ===
Key

The highest mark recorded in each event is highlighted in yellow

Rank	Athlete	Overall points	100 m	LJ	SP	HJ	400 m	110 m H	DT	PV	JT	1500 m
1st place, gold medalist(s)	Maurice Smith; Jamaica	8232 NR	926; 10.71 s w:+2.5	866; 7.22 m w:+3.2	839; 15.80 m	785; 1.98 m	883; 48.54 s	953; 14.17 s w:NWI	883; 50.62 m	702; 4.30 m	689; 56.76 m	706; 4:36.00 min
2nd place, silver medalist(s)	Ryan Harlan; United States	7997	850; 11.05 s w:+2.5	807; 6.97 m w:+3.5	838; 15.79 m	868; 2.07 m	831; 49.65 s	984; 13.93 s w:NWI	722; 42.80 m	790; 4.60 m	704; 57.75 m	603; 4:52.56 min
3rd place, bronze medalist(s)	Paul Terek; United States	7923	856; 11.02 s w:+2.5	859; 7.19 m w:+3.1	768; 14.64 m	785; 1.98 m	876; 48.70 s	827; 15.19 s w:NWI	672; 40.39 m	1004; 5.30 m	546; 47.10 m	730; 4:32.28 min
4	Chris Boyles; United States	7679	836; 11.11 s w:+3.2	854; 7.17 m w:+2.4	774; 14.75 m	813; 2.01 m	780; 50.75 s	880; 14.75 s w:NWI	687; 41.10 m	819; 4.70 m	647; 53.95 m	589; 4:55.01 min
5	Octavious Gillespie; Guatemala	7255	767; 11.43 s w:+2.5	850; 7.15 m w:+2.6	681; 13.22 m	813; 2.01 m	701; 52.54 s	829; 15.17 s w:NWI	652; 39.36 m	702; 4.30 m	748; 60.65 m	512; 5:08.50 min
6	Steven Marrero; Puerto Rico	7240	804; 11.26 s w:+3.2	762; 6.78 m w:+2.1	664; 12.95 m	627; 1.80 m	851; 49.22 s	724; 16.08 s w:NWI	689; 41.20 m	760; 4.50 m	617; 51.92 m	742; 4:30.47 min
7	Andrés Horacio Mantilla; Colombia	6973 NR	821; 11.18 s w:+3.2	709; 6.55 m w:+2.5	619; 12.20 m	758; 1.95 m	731; 51.86 s	833; 15.14 s w:NWI	674; 40.46 m	617; 4.00 m	583; 49.63 m	628; 4:48.40 min
8	Juan Pedro Santarosa; Mexico	6593	769; 11.42 s w:+3.2	608; 6.10 m w:+2.9	583; 11.62 m	653; 1.83 m	750; 51.43 s	768; 15.69 s w:NWI	628; 38.22 m	673; 4.20 m	489; 43.19 m	672; 4:41.31 min
9	Marcos Sánchez-Valle; Puerto Rico	6578	821; 11.18 s w:+3.2	702; 6.52 m w:+3.3	587; 11.68 m	627; 1.80 m	849; 49.27 s	729; 16.03 s w:NWI	507; 32.13 m	457; 3.40 m	593; 50.30 m	706; 4:35.96 min
10	Freddy Díaz; Venezuela	6396	742; 11.55 s w:+3.2	655; 6.31 m w:+2.9	548; 11.03 m	602; 1.77 m	730; 51.87 s	791; 15.49 s w:NWI	486; 31.09 m	645; 4.10 m	479; 42.57 m	718; 4:34.07 min
DNF	Jay Atchenson; Canada	5880	801; 11.27 s w:+3.2	655; 6.31 m w:+2.9	581; 11.58 m	679; 1.86 m	788; 50.59 s	762; 15.74 s w:NWI	553; 34.45 m	562; 3.80 m	499; 43.90 m	DNS
DNF	Jamie Adjetey-Nelson; Canada	5264	870; 10.96 s w:+2.5	876; 7.26 m w:+3.1	547; 11.02 m	813; 2.01 m	833; 49.61 s	827; 15.19 s w:NWI	498; 31.72 m	DNS		
DNF	James Holder; Canada	797	797; 11.29 s w:+2.5	DNS								
DNS	José Román; Puerto Rico											

=== Women's Heptathlon ===
Key

The highest mark recorded in each event is highlighted in yellow

Rank	Athlete	Overall points	100 m H	HJ	SP	200 m	LJ	JT	800 m
1st place, gold medalist(s)	Fiona Asigbee; United States	5868	1031; 13.63 s w:+1.5	1003; 1.82 m	693; 12.48 m	913; 24.72 s w:+1.5	853; 6.01 m w:+2.8	590; 35.94 m	785; 2:22.85 min
2nd place, silver medalist(s)	Tracye Lawyer-Thomas; United States	5603	1018; 13.72 s w:+2.8	928; 1.76 m	742; 13.22 m	938; 24.45 s w:+1.2	771; 5.74 m w:+3.2	630; 38.07 m	576; 2:39.69 min
3rd place, bronze medalist(s)	Jackie Poulson; United States	5499	901; 14.56 s w:+2.8	747; 1.61 m	662; 12.02 m	878; 25.10 s w:+1.5	765; 5.72 m w:+2.9	689; 41.14 m	857; 2:17.56 min
4	Coralys Ortiz; Puerto Rico	5321 NR	916; 14.45 s w:+2.8	712; 1.58 m	610; 11.23 m	818; 25.76 s w:+1.5	683; 5.44 m w:+3.7	845; 49.24 m	737; 2:26.50 min
5	Diana Ibargüen; Colombia	5203	945; 14.24 s w:+1.5	712; 1.58 m	639; 11.66 m	821; 25.73 s w:+1.2	753; 5.68 m w:+2.9	651; 39.17 m	682; 2:30.89 min
6	Nasli Perea; Colombia	5099	847; 14.96 s w:+1.5	855; 1.70 m	585; 10.85 m	751; 26.54 s w:+1.2	774; 5.75 m w:+2.6	612; 37.10 m	675; 2:31.47 min
7	Nadina Marsh; Jamaica	4977	923; 14.40 s w:+2.8	855; 1.70 m	575; 10.69 m	786; 26.13 s w:+1.2	700; 5.50 m w:+2.8	584; 35.64 m	554; 2:41.67 min
8	Yalitza Rivera; Puerto Rico	4949	891; 14.63 s w:+1.5	855; 1.70 m	614; 11.28 m	763; 26.39 s w:+1.5	584; 5.09 m w:+2.8	519; 32.21 m	723; 2:27.60 min
9	Juana Castillo; Dominican Republic	4931	777; 15.50 s w:+1.5	747; 1.61 m	666; 12.08 m	746; 26.59 s w:+1.5	612; 5.19 m w:+3.0	600; 36.50 m	783; 2:22.98 min
10	Anna-Kay Campbell; Jamaica	4633	855; 14.90 s w:+2.8	747; 1.61 m	354; 7.30 m	850; 25.40 s w:+1.2	887; 6.12 m w:+2.9	312; 21.26 m	628; 2:35.27 min
11	Mariana Abuela; Mexico	4536	783; 15.45 s w:+1.5	712; 1.58 m	497; 9.51 m	692; 27.24 s w:+1.5	540; 4.93 m w:+3.1	565; 34.63 m	747; 2:25.72 min
12	Nahomi Rivera; Puerto Rico	4466	729; 15.88 s w:+2.8	747; 1.61 m	507; 9.65 m	718; 26.93 s w:+1.5	674; 5.41 m w:+2.6	541; 33.40 m	550; 2:42.00 min
DNF	Mereció Kytzzia Vázquez; Mexico	1771	695; 16.16 s w:+1.5	610; 1.49 m	466; 9.03 m	DNS			
DNF	Véronique Fortin; Canada	816	138; 22.33 s w:+2.8	678; 1.55 m	DNS				

== Participation ==
An unofficial count yields the participation of 28 athletes from 9 countries. Obviously, the event was also open for athletes from CACAC member nations that are non-NACAC members (Colombia and Venezuela).

- Canada (4)
- Colombia (3)
- Dominican Republic (1)
- Guatemala (1)
- Jamaica (3)
- Mexico (3)
- Puerto Rico (6)
- United States (6)
- Venezuela (1)

== See also ==
- 2005 in athletics (track and field)
