= 2015 Pan American Combined Events Cup =

- Organisers: APA
- Edition: 10th
- Date: June 19–20
- Host city: Ottawa, Ontario, Canada
- Venue: Terry Fox Stadium
- Participation: 44 + 1 guest athletes from 9 + 1 guest nations

The 2015 Pan American Combined Events Cup was held in Ottawa, Ontario, Canada, at the Terry Fox Stadium between June 19–20, 2015. The event also served as IAAF Capital Cup as part of the 2015 IAAF Combined Events Challenge, as NACAC Combined Events Invitational, and as Canadian Combined Events Championships. Detailed reports and an appraisal of the results were given.

Complete results were published.

== Medallists ==
Event	Gold		Silver		Bronze	
Men's decathlon	Yordani García; Cuba	7977	Juan Carlos de la Cruz; Dominican Republic	7504	Kevin Lazas; United States	7483
Women's heptathlon	Yorgelis Rodríguez; Cuba	6068	Madelaine Buttinger; Canada	5643	Jillian Drouin; Canada	5615

== Results ==
=== Men's decathlon ===
Key

The highest mark recorded in each event is highlighted in yellow

Rank	Athlete	Overall points	100 m	LJ	SP	HJ	400 m	110 m H	DT	PV	JT	1500 m
1st place, gold medalist(s)	Yordani García; Cuba	7977	874; 10.94 s w:-0.9	739; 6.68 m w:-0.4	742; 14.22 m	785; 1.98 m	891; 48.37 s	975; 14.00 s w:+0.9	666; 40.09 m	880; 4.90 m	723; 59.01 m	702; 4:36.59 min
2nd place, silver medalist(s)	Juan Carlos de la Cruz; Dominican Republic	7504	836; 11.11 s w:+1.2	729; 6.64 m w:+0.5	691; 13.39 m	785; 1.98 m	831; 49.64 s	891; 14.66 s w:+0.9	673; 40.42 m	790; 4.60 m	592; 50.23 m	686; 4:39.16 min
3rd place, bronze medalist(s)	Kevin Lazas; United States	7483	810; 11.23 s w:+1.2	809; 6.98 m w:+0.9	722; 13.90 m	705; 1.89 m	745; 51.54 s	794; 15.47 s w:+1.5	633; 38.43 m	880; 4.90 m	704; 57.76 m	681; 4:39.90 min
4	José Ángel Mendieta; Cuba	7368	832; 11.13 s w:-0.9	697; 6.50 m w:-1.0	772; 14.71 m	705; 1.89 m	840; 49.45 s	890; 14.67 s w:+0.9	661; 39.83 m	617; 4.00 m	743; 60.31 m	611; 4:51.23 min
5	Austin Bahner; United States	7358	827; 11.15 s w:-0.9	797; 6.93 m w:+2.0	651; 12.74 m	705; 1.89 m	842; 49.42 s	769; 15.68 s w:+1.5	745; 43.96 m	760; 4.50 m	616; 51.83 m	646; 4:45.45 min
6	Pat Arbour; Canada	7147	717; 11.67 s w:-0.9	750; 6.73 m w:+0.2	753; 14.40 m	679; 1.86 m	716; 52.19 s	797; 15.44 s w:+1.5	830; 48.07 m	673; 4.20 m	725; 59.15 m	507; 5:09.35 min
7	Evan Weinstock; United States	7112	834; 11.12 s w:-0.9	707; 6.54 m w:+1.1	631; 12.41 m	653; 1.83 m	818; 49.92 s	841; 15.07 s w:+0.9	716; 42.54 m	673; 4.20 m	641; 53.55 m	598; 4:53.52 min
8	Josué Louis; Haiti	6663	748; 11.52 s w:+1.2	727; 6.63 m w:+0.1	617; 12.17 m	758; 1.95 m	719; 52.13 s	859; 14.92 s w:+1.5	529; 33.26 m	617; 4.00 m	563; 48.29 m	526; 5:06.03 min
DNF	Kurt Felix; Grenada	6642	823; 11.17 s w:-0.9	920; 7.44 m w:0.0	716; 13.80 m	896; 2.10 m	860; 49.02 s	831; 15.15 s w:+0.9	783; 45.76 m	0 NM	813; 65.00 m	0 DNS
9	Shaw Baudoin; Canada	6579	765; 11.44 s w:+1.2	582; 5.98 m w:+1.4	629; 12.38 m	653; 1.83 m	792; 50.49 s	727; 16.05 s w:-0.6	486; 31.11 m	617; 4.00 m	582; 49.53 m	746; 4:29.80 min
10	Dylan Golow; Canada	6427	618; 12.17 s w:-0.9	746; 6.71 m w:+0.6	565; 11.32 m	679; 1.86 m	690; 52.80 s	682; 16.46 s w:-0.6	494; 31.48 m	645; 4.10 m	606; 51.16 m	702; 4:36.65 min
11	Justin Massar; Canada	6248	628; 12.12 s w:-0.9	619; 6.15 m w:-0.5	651; 12.73 m	653; 1.83 m	550; 56.24 s	713; 16.18 s w:-0.6	638; 38.69 m	562; 3.80 m	705; 57.80 m	529; 5:05.49 min
12	Pierre Landry; Canada	6047	750; 11.51 s w:+1.2	707; 6.54 m w:+1.2	455; 9.49 m	602; 1.77 m	704; 52.48 s	592; 17.31 s w:-0.6	509; 32.27 m	535; 3.70 m	488; 43.18 m	705; 4:36.15 min
13	Justin Conlon; Canada	5841	641; 12.05 s w:-0.9	615; 6.13 m w:+2.9	636; 12.49 m	602; 1.77 m	659; 53.53 s	604; 17.20 s w:-0.6	469; 30.24 m	457; 3.40 m	550; 47.40 m	608; 4:51.83 min
14	Toluwalope Makinde; Canada	5477	870; 10.96 s w:-0.9	559; 5.87 m w:-0.8	455; 9.49 m	528; 1.68 m	813; 50.04 s	730; 16.02 s w:-0.6	300; 21.51 m	457; 3.40 m	248; 26.34 m	517; 5:07.48 min
15	Chris Robertson; Canada	5356	677; 11.87 s w:-0.9	718; 6.59 m w:+0.2	600; 11.90 m	731; 1.92 m	685; 52.92 s	735; 15.98 s w:-0.6	640; 38.78 m	0 NM	570; 48.71 m	0 DNF
16	Matthew Johnson; Canada	5021	673; 11.89 s w:-0.9	641; 6.25 m w:+0.2	518; 10.54 m	602; 1.77 m	701; 52.54 s	596; 17.27 s w:-0.6	0 NM	0 NM	552; 47.51 m	738; 4:31.06 min
DNF	Lindon Victor; Grenada	3786	804; 11.26 s w:-0.9	746; 6.71 m w:+0.7	705; 13.62 m	813; 2.01 m	718; 52.16 s	0 DNS w:+1.5	0 DNS	DNS		
DNF	Gonzalo Barroilhet; Chile	2817	740; 11.56 s w:+1.2	644; 6.26 m w:-1.5	728; 13.99 m	705; 1.89 m	0 DNS	DNS				
DNF	Leonel Suárez; Cuba	1393	736; 11.58 s w:+1.2	657; 6.32 m w:+2.4	0 DNS	DNS						
DNF	Zachary Bornstein; Canada	778	778; 11.38 s w:+1.2	0 NM	0 NM	DNS	DNS					
—	Vincent Lanctot-Reeves; Canada	DNS	0 DNS s w:-0.9	0 DNS	DNS							
—	Peter Malo Nsaka; Canada	DNS	0 DNS s w:-0.9	0 DNS	DNS							

=== Women's heptathlon ===
Key

The highest mark recorded in each event is highlighted in yellow

Rank	Athlete	Overall points	100 m H	HJ	SP	200 m	LJ	JT	800 m
1st place, gold medalist(s)	Yorgelis Rodríguez; Cuba	6068	978; 14.00 s w:+0.6	1054; 1.86 m	763; 13.53 m	908; 24.77 s w:+2.6	813; 5.88 m w:-0.3	721; 42.82 m	831; 2:19.42 min
—	Uhunoma Osazuwa; Nigeria	6008	1063; 13.41 s w:-0.8	1016; 1.83 m	663; 12.03 m	961; 24.21 s w:-0.3	877; 6.09 m w:-1.2	638; 38.47 m	790; 2:22.46 min
2nd place, silver medalist(s)	Madelaine Buttinger; Canada	5643	901; 14.56 s w:+0.6	867; 1.71 m	711; 12.75 m	879; 25.08 s w:+2.6	816; 5.89 m w:+0.5	615; 37.27 m	854; 2:17.77 min
3rd place, bronze medalist(s)	Jillian Drouin; Canada	5615	971; 14.05 s w:-0.8	941; 1.77 m	742; 13.22 m	813; 25.82 s w:+2.6	753; 5.68 m w:0.0	591; 36.01 m	804; 2:21.47 min
4	Chantae McMillan; United States	5601	985; 13.95 s w:-0.8	795; 1.65 m	741; 13.21 m	812; 25.83 s w:-1.5	723; 5.58 m w:0.0	781; 45.92 m	764; 2:24.45 min
5	Tiffeny Parker; United States	5557	960; 14.13 s w:-0.8	867; 1.71 m	686; 12.38 m	869; 25.20 s w:+2.6	750; 5.67 m w:+0.2	727; 43.13 m	698; 2:29.61 min
6	Amber Metoyer; United States	5468	910; 14.49 s w:+0.6	830; 1.68 m	772; 13.67 m	840; 25.52 s w:+2.6	654; 5.34 m w:-1.2	748; 44.20 m	714; 2:28.34 min
7	Ryann Krais; United States	5461	894; 14.61 s w:+0.6	830; 1.68 m	698; 12.56 m	788; 26.11 s w:+2.6	680; 5.43 m w:0.0	732; 43.38 m	839; 2:18.83 min
8	Makeba Alcide; Saint Lucia	5434	953; 14.18 s w:+0.6	903; 1.74 m	706; 12.68 m	880; 25.07 s w:-0.3	709; 5.53 m w:0.0	529; 32.77 m	754; 2:25.19 min
9	Kaymarie Jones; Jamaica	5385	998; 13.86 s w:-0.8	830; 1.68 m	699; 12.57 m	917; 24.67 s w:-0.3	606; 5.17 m w:+2.8	585; 35.72 m	750; 2:25.55 min
10	Jessica Flax; United States	5318	980; 13.99 s w:-0.8	795; 1.65 m	681; 12.30 m	856; 25.34 s w:-0.3	643; 5.30 m w:+0.7	502; 31.35 m	861; 2:17.25 min
11	Carolyn Adams; Canada	4793	855; 14.90 s w:+0.6	795; 1.65 m	523; 9.90 m	748; 26.57 s w:-1.5	581; 5.08 m w:0.0	519; 32.24 m	772; 2:23.81 min
12	Maude Leveillé; Canada	4738	859; 14.87 s w:-0.5	689; 1.56 m	480; 9.24 m	864; 25.25 s w:-1.5	680; 5.43 m w:+1.6	449; 28.53 m	717; 2:28.06 min
13	Alana Battiston; Canada	4695	755; 15.67 s w:+0.6	795; 1.65 m	524; 9.91 m	675; 27.45 s w:-1.5	576; 5.06 m w:+0.9	536; 33.11 m	834; 2:19.23 min
14	Chantel Pilon; Canada	4492	692; 16.18 s w:-0.5	655; 1.53 m	564; 10.52 m	721; 26.89 s w:-1.5	589; 5.11 m w:0.0	427; 27.38 m	844; 2:18.47 min
15	Zarria Storm; Canada	4074	787; 15.42 s w:-0.5	724; 1.59 m	544; 10.22 m	705; 27.08 s w:-1.5	482; 4.71 m w:0.0	408; 26.35 m	424; 2:53.87 min
16	Marissa Turner; Canada	3856	475; 18.13 s w:-0.5	724; 1.59 m	410; 8.16 m	809; 25.87 s w:+2.6	461; 4.63 m w:0.0	187; 14.45 m	790; 2:22.47 min
DNF	Astrid Nyame; Canada	3843	984; 13.96 s w:+0.6	655; 1.53 m	649; 11.82 m	835; 25.57 s w:-0.3	720; 5.57 m w:-0.2	0 NM	0 DNS
DNF	Jessica Zelinka; Canada	3518	1066; 13.39 s w:-0.8	830; 1.68 m	720; 12.89 m	902; 24.83 s w:-0.3	0 DNS	DNS	
17	Tracey Edwards; Canada	3063	672; 16.35 s w:-0.5	0 NM	406; 8.11 m	702; 27.12 s w:-1.5	540; 4.93 m w:0.0	215; 16.02 m	528; 2:44.03 min
DNF	Danielle Delage; Canada	2176	805; 15.28 s w:-0.5	795; 1.65 m	576; 10.71 m	0 DNF w:-0.3	0 DNS	DNS	
DNF	Geneviève Gagné; Canada	0	0 DNF w:-0.5	0 DNS	0 DNS	DNS			

== Participation ==
According to an unofficial count, 44 (+ 1 guest) athletes from 9 (+ 1 guest) countries participated in the event.

- Canada (25)
- Chile (1)
- Cuba (4)
- Dominican Republic (1)
- Grenada (2)
- Haiti (1)
- Jamaica (1)
- Saint Lucia (1)
- United States (8)

Guest:

- Nigeria (1)

== See also ==
- 2015 in athletics (track and field)
