= 2011 NACAC Combined Events Championships =

- Organisers: NACAC
- Edition: 6th
- Date: May 27–28
- Host city: Kingston, Jamaica
- Venue: Usain Bolt Track
- Participation: 28 + 1 invited athletes from 12 + 1 invited nations

The 2011 NACAC Combined Events Championships were held in Mona, Saint Andrew, Jamaica, at the Usain Bolt Track of the University of the West Indies on May 27–28, 2011. A detailed report on the event and an appraisal of the results was given.

Complete results were published.

== Medallists ==
Event	Gold		Silver		Bronze	
Men's Decathlon	Maurice Smith; Jamaica	8078	Damian Warner; Canada	7760	Chris Helwick; United States	7609
Women's Heptathlon	Emily Pearson; United States	5585	Salcia Slack; Jamaica	5534	Francia Marzanillo; Dominican Republic	5474

== Results ==
=== Men's Decathlon ===
Key

The highest mark recorded in each event is highlighted in yellow

Rank	Athlete	Overall points	100 m	LJ	SP	HJ	400 m	110 m H	DT	PV	JT	1500 m
1st place, gold medalist(s)	Maurice Smith; Jamaica	8078	874; 10.94 s w:-1.8	852; 7.16 m w:+2.2	906; 16.88 m	723; 1.91 m	824; 49.80 s	973; 14.01 s w:+0.5	821; 47.61 m	790; 4.60 m	685; 56.50 m	630; 4:48.13 min
2nd place, silver medalist(s)	Damian Warner; Canada	7760	933; 10.68 s w:-1.8	918; 7.43 m w:+1.9	657; 12.83 m	749; 1.94 m	825; 49.77 s	989; 13.89 s w:+0.5	772; 45.25 m	731; 4.40 m	643; 53.68 m	543; 5:02.98 min
3rd place, bronze medalist(s)	Chris Helwick; United States	7609	755; 11.49 s w:-2.0	833; 7.08 m w:+1.4	699; 13.52 m	776; 1.97 m	803; 50.26 s	796; 15.45 s w:+0.5	678; 40.67 m	819; 4.70 m	703; 57.71 m	747; 4:29.69 min
4	Chris Randolph; United States	7358	723; 11.64 s w:-2.0	823; 7.04 m w:+2.5	700; 13.54 m	749; 1.94 m	791; 50.52 s	829; 15.17 s w:+0.5	734; 43.42 m	673; 4.20 m	673; 55.68 m	663; 4:42.69 min
5	Steven Marrero; Puerto Rico	6647	667; 11.92 s w:-1.8	746; 6.71 m w:+0.5	688; 13.34 m	593; 1.76 m	737; 51.72 s	564; 17.59 s w:+0.5	764; 44.88 m	702; 4.30 m	674; 55.75 m	512; 5:08.42 min
6	Pat Arbour; Canada	6547	647; 12.02 s w:-2.0	595; 6.04 m w:+0.1	697; 13.48 m	619; 1.79 m	647; 53.82 s	775; 15.63 s w:+0.5	810; 47.10 m	535; 3.70 m	720; 58.83 m	502; 5:10.20 min
7	Rodrigo Sagaon; Mexico	6540	801; 11.27 s w:-2.0	578; 5.96 m w:+1.1	589; 11.72 m	544; 1.70 m	842; 49.42 s	742; 15.92 s w:+0.5	695; 41.49 m	617; 4.00 m	564; 48.32 m	568; 4:58.63 min
8	Darwin Colón; Honduras	6539	814; 11.21 s w:-1.8	702; 6.52 m w:+0.8	629; 12.37 m	619; 1.79 m	756; 51.29 s	846; 15.03 s w:+0.5	689; 41.20 m	535; 3.70 m	416; 38.22 m	533; 5:04.74 min
9	Jorge Eduard Rivera; Mexico	6367	661; 11.95 s w:-2.0	702; 6.52 m w:+1.0	594; 11.79 m	831; 2.03 m	721; 52.08 s	745; 15.89 s w:+0.5	559; 34.75 m	535; 3.70 m	511; 44.72 m	508; 5:09.15 min
DNF	Claston Bernard; Jamaica	5508	812; 11.22 s w:-1.8	764; 6.79 m w:+0.4	686; 13.30 m	803; 2.00 m	745; 51.55 s	903; 14.56 s w:+0.5	795; 46.37 m	0 NH	DNS	
10	Rolando Ayala; El Salvador	4723	673; 11.89 s w:-2.0	659; 6.33 m w:+1.8	444; 9.30 m	0 NH	758; 51.25 s	455; 18.75 s w:+0.5	337; 23.44 m	457; 3.40 m	379; 35.60 m	561; 4:59.71 min
DNF	Marcos Sánchez-Valle; Puerto Rico	2021	746; 11.53 s w:-1.8	584; 5.99 m w:+0.9	691; 13.39 m	DNS						
DNS	Joe Detmer; United States											

=== Women's Heptathlon ===
Key

The highest mark recorded in each event is highlighted in yellow

Rank	Athlete	Overall points	100 m H	HJ	SP	200 m	LJ	JT	800 m
1st place, gold medalist(s)	Emily Pearson; United States	5585	980; 13.99 s w:-1.2	806; 1.66 m	613; 11.27 m	887; 25.00 s w:-3.6	744; 5.65 m w:-2.9	751; 44.35 m	804; 2:21.48 min
2nd place, silver medalist(s)	Salcia Slack; Jamaica	5534	872; 14.77 s w:-1.8	736; 1.60 m	674; 12.20 m	795; 26.03 s w:-2.5	846; 5.99 m w:-1.1	745; 44.05 m	866; 2:16.91 min
—	Naomi Osazuwa; Nigeria	5506	990; 13.92 s w:-1.2	879; 1.72 m	658; 11.96 m	899; 24.87 s w:-3.6	822; 5.91 m w:+0.4	496; 31.00 m	762; 2:24.64 min
3rd place, bronze medalist(s)	Francia Marzanillo; Dominican Republic	5474	903; 14.54 s w:-2.3	771; 1.63 m	696; 12.52 m	850; 25.40 s w:-2.5	651; 5.33 m w:+0.0	726; 43.08 m	877; 2:16.11 min
4	Juana Castillo; Dominican Republic	5356	862; 14.85 s w:-2.3	806; 1.66 m	707; 12.70 m	713; 26.98 s w:-3.6	729; 5.60 m w:-0.1	677; 40.53 m	862; 2:17.18 min
5	Jen Cotten; Canada	5245	966; 14.09 s w:-1.2	736; 1.60 m	581; 10.79 m	850; 25.40 s w:-3.6	807; 5.86 m w:-1.7	413; 26.63 m	892; 2:15.03 min
6	Kasey Hill; United States	5194	938; 14.29 s w:-1.2	736; 1.60 m	722; 12.92 m	821; 25.73 s w:-3.6	686; 5.45 m w:-1.7	460; 29.13 m	831; 2:19.42 min
7	Audilia da Veiga /Martinique	4883	932; 14.33 s w:-2.3	842; 1.69 m	677; 12.24 m	742; 26.64 s w:-2.5	606; 5.17 m w:-1.2	497; 31.08 m	587; 2:38.75 min
8	Karla Scheleske; Mexico	4816	831; 15.08 s w:-2.3	842; 1.69 m	564; 10.53 m	669; 27.52 s w:-2.5	645; 5.31 m w:-1.4	573; 35.08 m	692; 2:30.05 min
9	Shianne Smith; Bermuda	4807	817; 15.19 s w:-1.8	632; 1.51 m	525; 9.93 m	827; 25.66 s w:-2.5	651; 5.33 m w:-0.6	492; 30.82 m	863; 2:17.14 min
10	Ayde Villareal; Mexico	4779	931; 14.34 s w:-1.2	701; 1.57 m	417; 8.27 m	793; 26.05 s w:-3.6	831; 5.94 m w:-1.0	254; 18.14 m	852; 2:17.93 min
11	Sharon Day; United States	4771	949; 14.21 s w:-1.2	879; 1.72 m	780; 13.79 m	856; 25.34 s w:-3.6	715; 5.55 m w:-3.4	592; 36.09 m	DNS
12	Ana María Porras; Costa Rica	4602	806; 15.27 s w:-2.3	806; 1.66 m	531; 10.03 m	691; 27.25 s w:-3.6	732; 5.61 m w:-0.1	356; 23.58 m	680; 2:31.02 min
13	Gleneve Grange; Jamaica	4331	584; 17.11 s w:-1.8	632; 1.51 m	533; 10.06 m	738; 26.69 s w:-3.6	617; 5.21 m w:-1.0	491; 30.74 m	736; 2:26.59 min
14	Ruth Morales; Guatemala	4008	672; 16.35 s w:-2.3	701; 1.57 m	466; 9.03 m	681; 27.38 s w:-3.6	464; 4.64 m w:-0.4	462; 29.21 m	562; 2:40.95 min
DNF	Andrea Jackson; Bermuda	2012	713; 16.01 s w:-1.8	666; 1.54 m	633; 11.58 m	DNS			
DNS	Janieve Russell; Jamaica								

== Participation ==
An unofficial count yields the participation of 28 athletes from 12 countries.

- Bermuda (2)
- Canada (3)
- Costa Rica (1)
- Dominican Republic (2)
- El Salvador (1)
- Guatemala (1)
- Honduras (1)
- Jamaica (4)
- /Martinique (1)
- Mexico (4)
- Puerto Rico (2)
- United States (5)

Invited:

- Nigeria (1)

== See also ==
- 2011 in athletics (track and field)
