= Athletics at the 1999 Summer Universiade – Women's heptathlon =

The women's heptathlon event at the 1999 Summer Universiade was held at the Estadio Son Moix in Palma de Mallorca, Spain on 9 and 10.

== Results ==
The highest mark recorded in each event is highlighted in yellow

Rank	Athlete	Nationality	100m H	HJ	SP	200m	LJ	JT	800m	Points	Notes
1st place, gold medalist(s)	Tiffany Lott	United States	13.55	1.67	14.38	25.06	5.87	49.11	2:25.92	5959	
2nd place, silver medalist(s)	Kateřina Nekolná	Czech Republic	14.16	1.73	12.82	25.14	6.01	44.32	2:17.29	5900	
3rd place, bronze medalist(s)	Clare Thompson	Australia	14.19	1.76	12.25	24.91	6.02	37.47	2:18.97	5766	
4	Patience Itanyi	Nigeria	13.56	1.64	10.24	24.43	6.38	38.41	2:25.94	5660	
5	Rutti Luksepp	Estonia	14.73	1.64	11.93	24.57	6.22	38.80	2:23.13	5587	
6	Tracye Lawyer	United States	13.87	1.79	13.06	24.64	5.61	36.32	DQ	4943	
7	Silvia Dalla Piana	Italy	14.48	1.70	9.89	26.18	5.98	39.08	DNF	4943	
	Maralize Fouché	South Africa	13.82	1.79	13.50	23.57	NM	DNS	–	DNF	
