= Julio Jiménez =

Julio Jiménez may refer to:

- Julio Jimenez (writer), Colombian writer
- Julio Jiménez (cyclist) (1934–2022), Spanish cyclist
- Julio Jiménez (politician) (1964–2020), Bolivian politician
- Julio Jiménez Rueda (1896–1960), Mexican lawyer, writer, playwright and diplomat
- Julio César Jiménez (born 1954), Uruguayan footballer
