= José Mendieta =

Bolivian politician (born 1958)

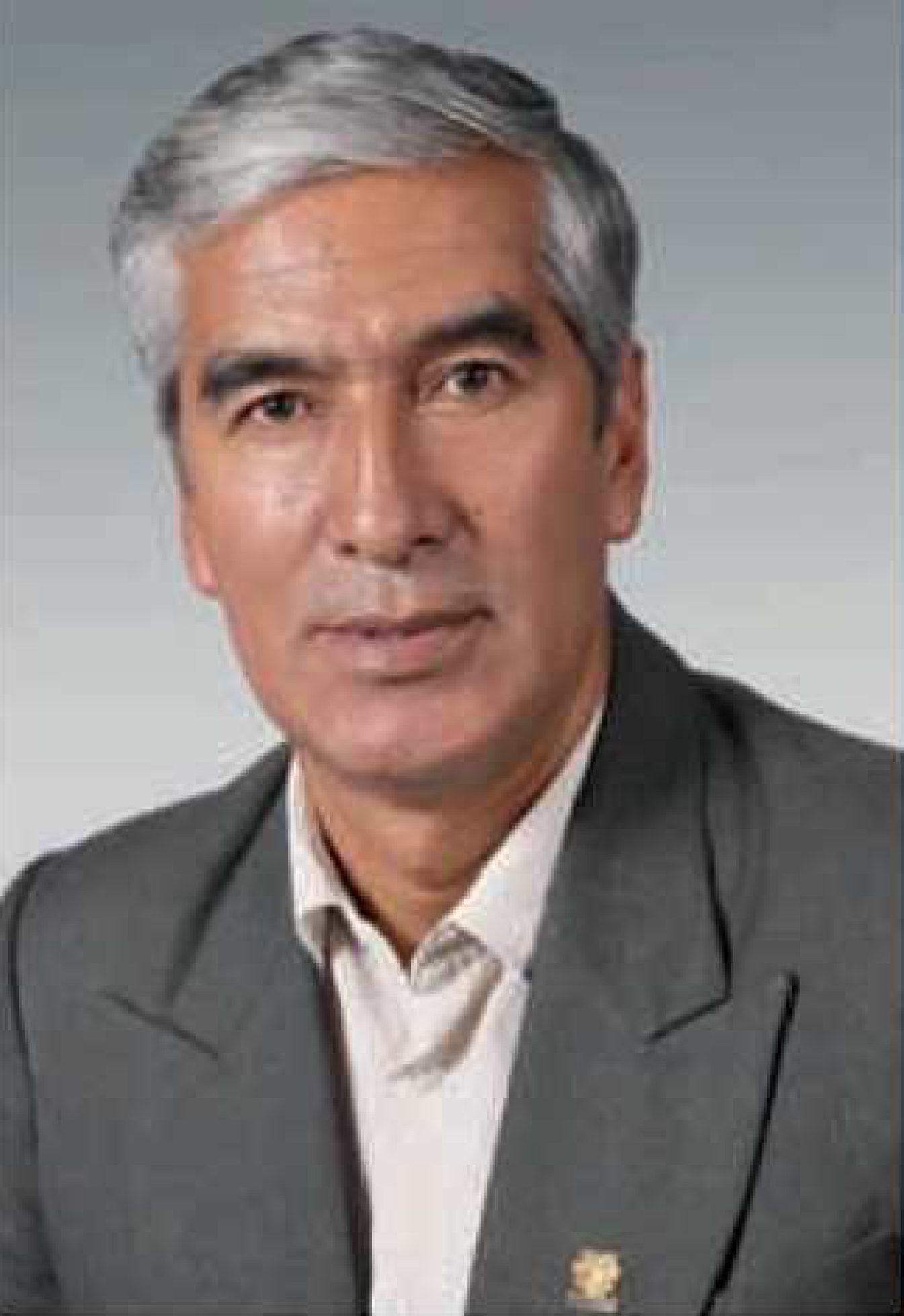
- Official portrait, 2014

Member of the Chamber of Deputies from Cochabamba circumscription 28
- In office 19 January 2010 – 18 January 2015
- Substitute: Marcelina Villarroel
- Preceded by: Alejandro Peña
- Succeeded by: Julio Jiménez (Note: Redistribution; circumscription 23.)
- Constituency: Chapare; Tiraque

Personal details
- Born: José Félix Mendieta Villarroel; 15 November 1958 (age 67) Sacaba, Cochabamba, Bolivia
- Party: Movement for Socialism
- Education: Enrique Finot Normal School
- Occupation: Activist; politician; trade unionist

José Félix Mendieta Villarroel (born 15 November 1958) is a Bolivian politician and trade unionist who served as a member of the Chamber of Deputies from Cochabamba, representing circumscription 28 from 2010 to 2015.

Though educated in pedagogy, Mendieta spent most of his career in commercial driving, climbing the ranks of the sector's trade unions to eventually become general secretary of the Sacaba Mixed Motor Transport Union. Though traditionally conservative, under the leadership of figures like Mendieta, many of the country's drivers' unions were reoriented towards the left.

Starting in the early 2000s, the driving sector's alliance with the Movement for Socialism opened spaces for many of its representatives to attain elective office. Such was the case with Mendieta, who, from 2005 to 2009, served on Sacaba's municipal council before later being elected to represent the area's drivers' unions in the Chamber of Deputies.

== Early life and political career ==
=== Early life and education ===
José Mendieta was born on 15 November 1958 in Sacaba, Cochabamba, to Profacio Mendieta and Florencia Villarroel. Mendieta was raised in a household of modest means; his father worked as a commercial driver while his mother was a local merchant. He completed his primary studies at the Germán Busch School, later attending the José Nicolas Maldonado School before seeking higher education in pedagogy, graduating from the Enrique Finot Normal School. He briefly taught mathematics at an institution in Warnes but retired after just two years due to the financial constraints and low income received from practicing the profession.

=== Career and trade unionism ===
Unable to continue teaching, Mendieta returned to Sacaba, where he dedicated himself to commercial driving. In the ensuing years, he became affiliated with the city's drivers' unions, spending nearly a decade in leadership roles in the Sacaba Mixed Motor Transport Union, including holding office as the organization's general secretary for six years.

Under Mendieta's leadership, the organized drivers continued to push for their historical demands, such as the lowering of excessive tolls or the expansion of fuel access. However, they were also oriented in favor of broader social issues, with Mendieta supporting mobilizations against the privatization of water and in favor of resource nationalism. His tenure represented a broader trend of realignment on the part of the country's transportation sector—long unique for its more conservative orientation in comparison to other unions—towards left-wing political positions.

The shift in disposition among the drivers' unions coincided with the rising primacy of the nascent Movement for Socialism (MAS-IPSP), with both groups steadily coalescing into a broader alliance. Already in 2004, Mendieta was invited by the MAS to run for a seat on the Sacaba Municipal Council, a position he won. His tenure as a municipal councillor focused on guaranteeing the water supply in Sacaba, a region that continued to suffer debilitating shortages in the wake of the Cochabamba water conflict.

== Chamber of Deputies ==
=== Election ===
The alliance between the MAS and the drivers' unions solidified from 2005 on and translated into the nomination of at least one union representative per department. Mendieta's prominence as a local transport leader led Sacaba's drivers' union to select him as their representative in parliament. Customarily, candidates chosen by the drivers' unions were registered on the MAS's electoral list, but Mendieta's municipal experience led the party to run him in a single-member constituency. He won by an absolute majority in Cochabamba's circumscription 28, one of the MAS's primary bases of support.

=== Tenure ===
As was the case on the municipal council, Mendieta spent much of his tenure in the Chamber of Deputies working to improve access to water in Cochabamba's underdeveloped regions, for which he spent most of his term heading the chamber's Natural and Hydric Resources and Water Committee. Mendieta's term as chair also saw significant developments in Bolivia's dispute with Chile regarding sovereignty over the Silala River. In late 2012, the committee, followed shortly thereafter by the Chamber of Deputies and the Senate, passed a bill declaring the river's waters a strategic natural resource. "We are ratifying with this law our full right over these water resources," Mendieta stated, "we do not have to ask permission from anyone, not from Chile ... or any other country on the use of the Silala."

Nearing the conclusion of his mandate, Mendieta was not nominated for reelection, a common practice among the Movement for Socialism, which preferred to open up spaces for different representatives of allied sectors to enter parliament. Though Mendieta's political career ended there, Cochabamba's drivers' unions maintained their parliamentary presence through the elections of legislators such as Lucio Gómez.

=== Commission assignments ===
- Amazon Region, Land, Territory, Water, Natural Resources, and Environment Commission
  - Natural and Hydric Resources and Water Committee (Secretary: 2010–2011, 2012–2014; 2014–2015)
- Territorial Organization of the State and Autonomies Commission
  - Native Indigenous Autonomies Committee (2011–2012)

== Electoral history ==
Electoral history of José Mendieta
Year	Office	Party	Votes			Result	Ref.
Year	Office	Party	Total	%	P.	Result	Ref.
2004	Councillor	Movement for Socialism	12,063	34.75%	1st	Won	(Note: Presented on an electoral list. The data shown represents the share of the vote the entire party/alliance received in that constituency.)
2009	Deputy	Movement for Socialism	60,150	72.23%	1st	Won	
Source: Plurinational Electoral Organ | Electoral Atlas

Chamber of Deputies of Bolivia
Preceded by Alejandro Peña	Member of the Chamber of Deputies from Cochabamba circumscription 28; 2010–2015	Succeeded by Julio Jiménez
