= Kurt Felix (decathlete) =

Grenadian athlete

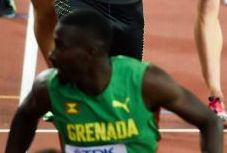
- Kurt Felix in 2017

Personal information
- Born: 4 July 1988 (age 37) St. George's, Grenada
- Height: 182 cm (6 ft 0 in)
- Weight: 76 kg (168 lb)

Sport
- Country: Grenada
- Sport: Athletics
- Event: Combined events
- College team: Boise State Broncos

Achievements and titles
- Personal best(s): Decathlon: 8509, Ratingen, Germany
Medal record
Men's athletics
Representing Grenada
Commonwealth Games
Bronze medal – third place	2014 Glasgow	Decathlon
Pan American Games
Silver medal – second place	2015 Toronto	Decathlon
- Updated on 29 August 2016

Kurt Felix (born 4 July 1988) is a Grenadian athlete who competes in the decathlon. He was the NCAA 2012 Division I Decathlon Champion and was named the Mountain West Men's Outdoor Track and Field Student-Athlete of the Year. He competed at the 2012 Summer Olympics and the 2016 Summer Olympics and won the bronze medal at the 2014 Commonwealth Games. On 24–25 July 2017, Kurt participated in the 21st Stadtwerke Ratingen Mehrkampf-meeting which was part of the IAAF Combined Events Challenge. He placed second at the meet with a score of 8509 points and set a meeting record in the Javelin Throw with a distance of 72.80m.

On 5 January 2018 at the National Sports Awards, Kurt received the Presidential Award of Merrit for 2017 from the Grenada Olympic Committee. He opened his 2018 Season by taking part in the Hepathlon competition at the World Indoor Championships but did not finish. He then competed in the Commonwealth Games where he finished forth in the decathlon with 7756 points.

His younger brother Lindon Victor is also a decathlete.

== Personal bests ==
Event	Result	Venue	Date
Outdoor
100 m	10.91 s (wind: +1.4 m/s)	Toronto, Canada	22 July 2015
Long jump	7.74 m (wind: +1.9 m/s)	Austin, United States	28 March 2012
Shot put	15.31 m	Ratingen, Germany	24 June 2017
High jump	2.15 m	Mesa, United States	10 April 2009
400 m	48.63 s A	Air Force Academy, United States	9 May 2012
400 m	48.63 s	Tucson, United States	9 April 2015
110 m hurdles	14.58 s (wind: -0.2 m/s)	Beijing, China	29 August 2015
Discus throw	50.82 m	Lafayette, United States	22 April 2017
Pole vault	4.60 m	Toronto, Canada	22 July 2015
Pole vault	4.60 m	Des Moines, United States	7 June 2012
Javelin throw	72.80 m	Ratingen, Germany	25 June 2017
1500 m	4:30.53 min	Rio de Janeiro, Brazil	18 August 2016
Decathlon	8509 pts	Ratingen, Germany	25 June 2017
Indoor
60 m	7.00 s	Portland, United States	18 March 2016
Long jump	7.66 m	Nampa, United States	10 February 2012
Shot put	15.02 m	Portland, United States	18 March 2016
High jump	2.17 m	Nampa, United States	24 February 2011
60 m hurdles	8.31 s	South Bend, United States	20 February 2016
Pole vault	4.61 m	West Lafayette, United States	13 February 2016
1000 m	2:42.91 min	College Station, United States	12 March 2011
Heptathlon	5986 pts	Portland, United States	19 March 2016

== Competition record ==
Year	Competition	Venue	Position	Event	Notes
Representing Grenada
2004	CARIFTA Games (U17)	Hamilton, Bermuda	3rd	High jump	1.80 m
2004	CARIFTA Games (U17)	Hamilton, Bermuda	1st	Javelin	50.29 m
2006	CARIFTA Games (U20)	Les Abymes, Guadeloupe	3rd	Heptathlon	4311 pts
2006	Central American and Caribbean Junior Championships (U20)	Port of Spain, Trinidad and Tobago	9th	High jump	1.90 m
2006	Central American and Caribbean Junior Championships (U20)	Port of Spain, Trinidad and Tobago	5th	Javelin	54.49
2007	CARIFTA Games (U20)	Providenciales, Turks and Caicos Islands	4th	Javelin	56.65 m
2007	CARIFTA Games (U20)	Providenciales, Turks and Caicos Islands	1st	Heptathlon	4675 pts
2008	Pan American Combined Events Championships	Santo Domingo, Dominican Republic	13th	Decathlon	6946 pts
2010	Central American and Caribbean Games	Mayagüez, Puerto Rico	7th	Javelin	64.54 m
2010	Central American and Caribbean Games	Mayagüez, Puerto Rico	5th	Decathlon	7144 pts
2010	Commonwealth Games	Delhi, India	11th	Decathlon	7121 pts
2012	Olympic Games	London, United Kingdom	–	Decathlon	DNF
2013	World Championships	Moscow, Russia	–	Decathlon	DNF
2014	Commonwealth Games	Glasgow, United Kingdom	3rd	Decathlon	8070 pts
2014	Central American and Caribbean Games	Xalapa, Mexico	9th	Javelin	58.55 m A
2015	Pan American Combined Events Cup	Ottawa, Canada	—	Decathlon	DNF
2015	Pan American Games	Toronto, Canada	2nd	Decathlon	8269 pts
2015	World Championships	Beijing, China	8th	Decathlon	8302 pts
2016	World Indoor Championships	Portland, United States	6th	Heptathlon	5986 pts
2016	Olympic Games	Rio de Janeiro, Brazil	9th	Decathlon	8323 pts
2017
2017	21st Stadtwerke Ratingen Mehrkampf-Meeting	Ratingen, Germany	2nd	Decathlon	8509 PR
2017	OECS Track And Field Championships	St. George's, Grenada	4th	Discus	46.25m
2017	OECS Track And Field Championships	St. George's, Grenada	1st	Long Jump	7.47m
2017	OECS Track And Field Championships	St. George's, Grenada	3rd	High Jump	2.03m
2017	World Championships	London, United Kingdom	7th	Decathlon	8227 pts
2017	Decastar	Talence, France	–	Decathlon	DNF
2018	World Indoor Championships	Birmingham, United Kingdom	–	Heptathlon	DNF
2018	Commonwealth Games	Gold Coast, Australia	4th	Decathlon	7756
2019	Pan American Games	Lima, Peru	–	Decathlon	DNF
