= 2006 World Junior Championships in Athletics – Men's decathlon =

The men's decathlon event at the 2006 World Junior Championships in Athletics was held in Beijing, China, at Chaoyang Sports Centre on 16 and 17 August. Junior implements were used, i.e. 99.0 cm (3'3) hurdles, 6 kg shot and 1.75 kg discus.

== Medalists ==
Gold	Arkadiy Vasilyev; Russia
Silver	Yordanis García; Cuba
Bronze	Jordan Vandermade; New Zealand

== Results ==
=== Final ===
16/17 August

The highest mark recorded in each event is highlighted in yellow

Rank	Name	Nationality	100m	LJ	SP	HJ	400m	110m H	DT	PV	JT	1500m	Points	Notes
1st place, gold medalist(s)	Arkadiy Vasilyev	Russia	11.08 (w: 1.3 m/s)	7.19	15.65	1.98	50.50	14.64 (w: 0.4 m/s)	42.85	4.80	67.43	4:47.44	8059	
2nd place, silver medalist(s)	Yordanis García	Cuba	10.80 (w: 1.8 m/s)	6.80	16.51	2.04	50.19	13.94 (w: 1.2 m/s)	42.10	4.20	57.65	4:55.97	7850	
3rd place, bronze medalist(s)	Jordan Vandermade	New Zealand	10.86 (w: 1.8 m/s)	7.16	14.97	1.98	48.96	15.80 (w: 0.4 m/s)	44.97	4.40	60.06	4:47.09	7807	
4	Sergey Dorofeev	Russia	11.12 (w: 1.8 m/s)	7.09	13.97	1.92	49.03	14.77 (w: 1.2 m/s)	37.63	4.60	46.48	4:35.53	7518	
5	Zhu Hengjun	China	10.91 (w: 1.9 m/s)	7.23	13.63	1.89	49.39	14.44 (w: 0.4 m/s)	36.71	4.40	50.80	4:45.74	7496	
6	Luiz Alberto de Araújo	Brazil	10.95 (w: 1.9 m/s)	7.09	14.68	1.86	51.06	14.04 (w: 0.4 m/s)	43.36	4.00	51.49	4:49.72	7472	
7	Aigar Kukk	Estonia	11.49 (w: 1.9 m/s)	7.11	13.25	1.98	54.02	15.22 (w: 0.3 m/s)	42.24	4.90	55.44	4:42.06	7450	
8	Eelco Sintnicolaas	Netherlands	11.11 (w: 1.3 m/s)	7.08	12.85	1.83	49.54	14.58 (w: 1.2 m/s)	35.78	4.80	45.98	4:30.37	7416	
9	Karol Bodula	Poland	11.29 (w: 1.3 m/s)	6.54	15.77	1.89	50.65	14.56 (w: 0.3 m/s)	42.93	4.40	50.31	4:50.75	7396	
10	Matthias Prey	Germany	11.03 (w: 1.8 m/s)	7.22	14.76	1.83	51.13	14.61 (w: 0.4 m/s)	45.44	3.70	53.28	4:56.08	7339	
11	Björn Barrefors	Sweden	11.29 (w: 1.9 m/s)	6.78	13.70	1.92	50.95	14.48 (w: 1.2 m/s)	38.68	4.60	52.87	4:55.03	7332	
12	Dmitriy Shcherbakov	Ukraine	10.92 (w: 1.3 m/s)	7.16	15.06	1.92	49.53	14.41 (w: 1.2 m/s)	32.31	4.00	46.54	4:50.02	7296	
13	Gaël Quérin	France	11.17 (w: 1.9 m/s)	7.20	12.08	1.89	49.96	14.37 (w: 0.3 m/s)	33.47	4.20	50.76	4:30.44	7292	
14	Liu Haibo	China	11.64 (w: 1.8 m/s)	6.71	13.99	2.10	51.39	15.56 (w: 0.3 m/s)	38.83	4.70	47.13	4:59.00	7199	
15	Antonín Vácha	Czech Republic	11.29 (w: 1.9 m/s)	6.73	13.97	1.89	51.47	14.90 (w: 1.2 m/s)	39.03	4.30	51.38	4:51.83	7153	
16	Andreas Züblin	Switzerland	11.29 (w: 1.8 m/s)	6.37	14.68	1.98	53.48	14.99 (w: 0.4 m/s)	38.53	4.60	47.93	4:52.48	7119	
17	Frans Boumans	Netherlands	11.21 (w: 1.9 m/s)	6.70	13.45	1.95	50.65	15.06 (w: 0.3 m/s)	35.70	4.10	54.80	4:54.84	7110	
18	Reid Gústavson	Canada	11.50 (w: 1.3 m/s)	6.58	13.15	1.95	50.44	15.55 (w: 0.4 m/s)	32.48	3.90	51.86	4:41.16	6873	
19	Shawn Schmidt	United States	11.43 (w: 1.8 m/s)	NM	12.95	2.04	51.58	15.41 (w: 0.3 m/s)	37.98	DNF	49.71	4:49.44	5645	
	Sami Itani	Finland	11.36 (w: 1.8 m/s)	6.67	14.33	2.07	52.40	15.05 (w: 1.2 m/s)	42.37	3.50	DNS	DNS	DNF	
	Daniel Awde	United Kingdom	11.02 (w: 1.3 m/s)	6.76	10.55	1.89	48.96	14.80 (w: 0.3 m/s)	NM	4.40	46.77	DNS	DNF	
	Michael Schrader	Germany	11.38 (w: 1.3 m/s)	7.09	13.82	1.89	52.44	15.36 (w: 0.3 m/s)	38.75	DNF	DNS	DNS	DNF	
	Kieran Fowler	New Zealand	11.27 (w: 1.9 m/s)	6.92	15.19	1.95	52.18	DNS	DNS	DNS	DNS	DNS	DNF	
	Matthew Clark	United States	11.19 (w: 1.3 m/s)	6.91	11.77	DNS	DNS	DNS	DNS	DNS	DNS	DNS	DNF	
	Jeremy Solot	Belgium	11.12 (w: 1.3 m/s)	7.01	DNS	DNS	DNS	DNS	DNS	DNS	DNS	DNS	DNF	

== Participation ==
According to an unofficial count, 25 athletes from 19 countries participated in the event.

- Belgium (1)
- Brazil (1)
- Canada (1)
- China (2)
- Cuba (1)
- Czech Republic (1)
- Estonia (1)
- Finland (1)
- France (1)
- Germany (2)
- Netherlands (2)
- New Zealand (2)
- Poland (1)
- Russia (2)
- Sweden (1)
- Switzerland (1)
- Ukraine (1)
- United Kingdom (1)
- United States (2)
