= Arkadiy Vasilyev =

Russian decathlete (born 1987)

Arkadiy Vasilyev (born 19 January 1987) is a Russian decathlete. Vasilyev won the decathlon at the 2006 World Junior Championships in Beijing.
