= Terry Fox Stadium =

Athletic field in Ottawa, Ontario

Coordinates: 45.370307°N 75.692185°W

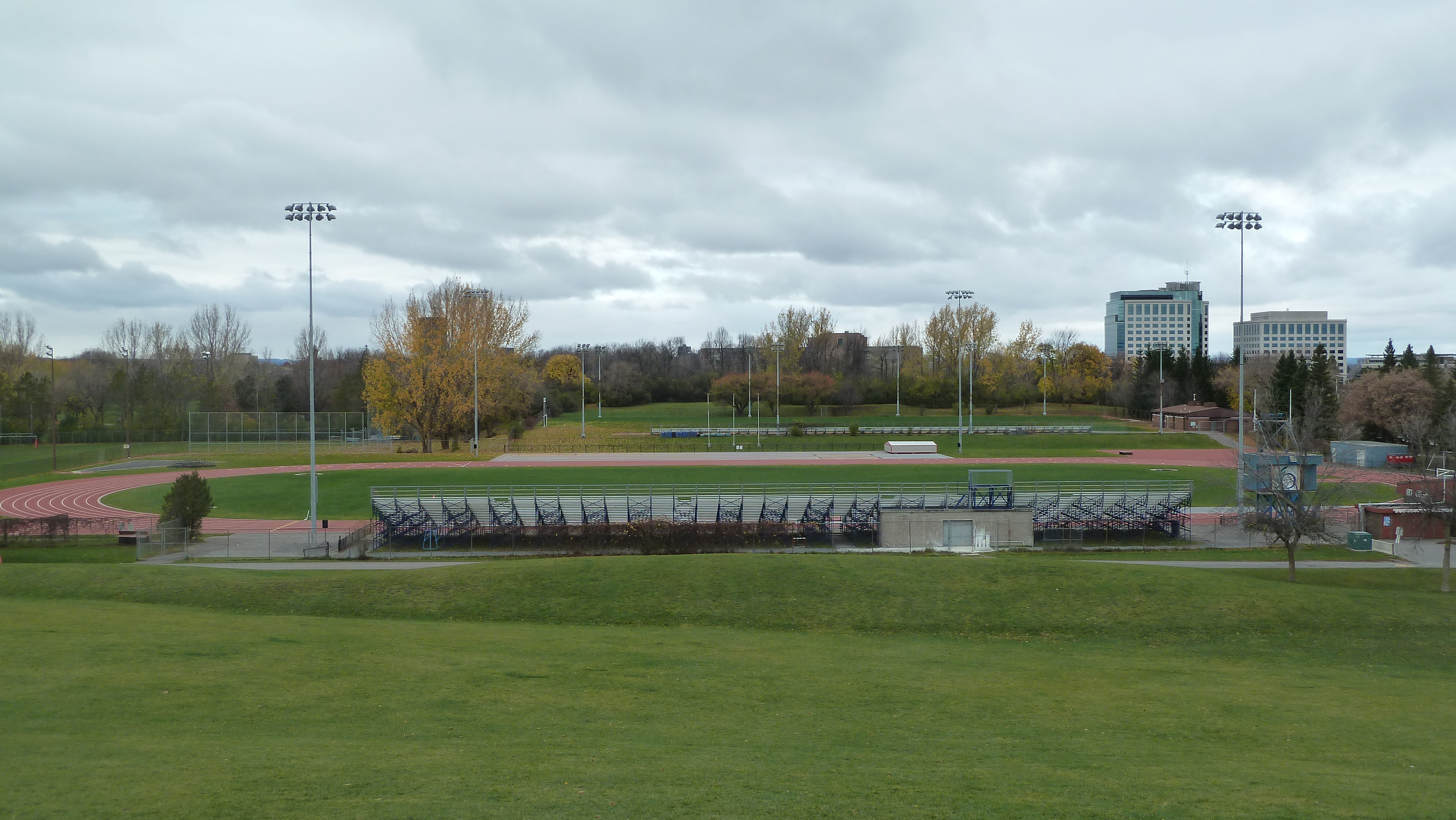
Terry Fox Stadium from Mooney's Bay Park

Terry Fox Stadium, also known as the Terry Fox Athletic Facility , is an athletic field in Ottawa, Ontario, Canada, named after cancer research activist Terry Fox. It has a regulation-size natural grass soccer field, surrounded by a 400-metre track. Surrounding the track are bleachers with a capacity of approximately 2,000. It is located in Mooney's Bay Park, on the west side of Riverside Drive, south of Heron Road, which is south of downtown Ottawa.

The stadium hosted the track and field events at the 2001 Francophone Games. It has hosted the Pan American Combined Events Cup since 2012.

== Facilities ==
The complex includes a polyurethane running track and three lighted natural grass sports fields. The fields are suitable for soccer, rugby, lacrosse, cross-country running, ultimate and other field sports.

== Teams ==
Terry Fox Stadium has been the site of several professional soccer teams, including the Ottawa Intrepid, and Capital City F.C. It currently hosts the semi-pro League1 Ontario team Ottawa South United Force.

== Usage ==
The track is the site of track and field training for public schools and universities in Ottawa. In the winter-time, the facility is adapted for cross-country skiing.
