= Yunior Díaz =

Cuban athletics competitor

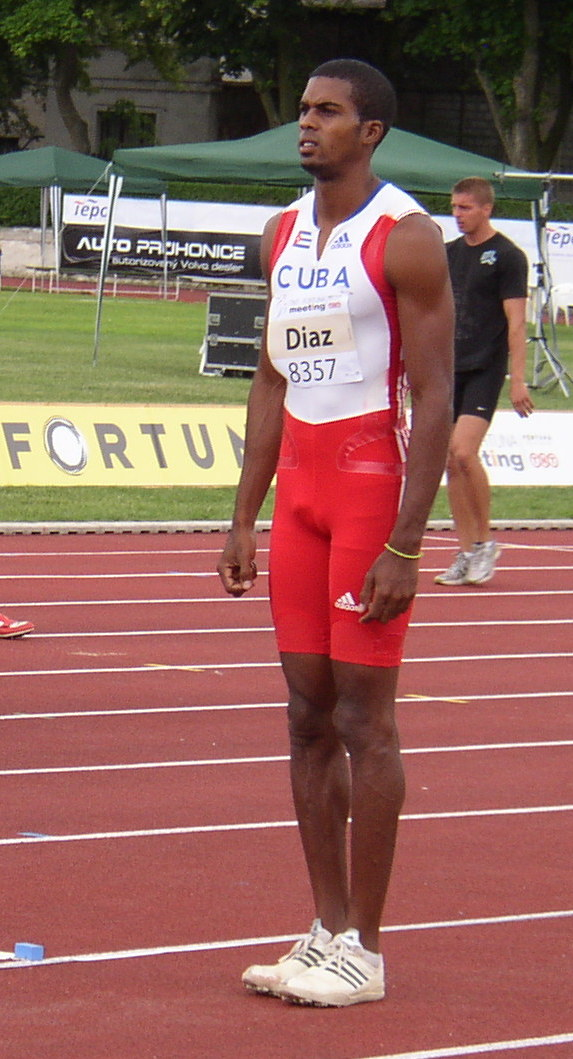
- Yunior Díaz at the 2011 TNT – Fortuna Meeting decathlon in Kladno

Personal information
- Full name: Yunior Díaz Zayas
- Born: 28 April 1987 (age 39) Sancti Spíritus, Cuba
- Height: 1.90 m (6 ft 3 in)
- Weight: 78 kg (172 lb)

Sport
- Country: Cuba
- Sport: Athletics
Medal record
Men's athletics
Representing Cuba
CAC Championships
Silver medal – second place	2009 Havana	Decathlon
- Updated on 25 December 2014

Yunior Díaz Zayas (born 28 April 1987]) is a Cuban track and field athlete who specialises in the decathlon and long jump. He represented Cuba at the 2008 Summer Olympics and also at the 2009 World Championships in Athletics. He won the silver medal at the 2009 Central American and Caribbean Championships in Athletics.

== Career ==
His first success as a junior athlete came at the 2005 Pan American Junior Athletics Championships where he won the silver medal. Díaz emerged as one of a talented trio of Cuban male decathletes along with Leonel Suárez and Yordanis García. Cuban combined events coach Gabino Arzola stated in 2005 that it was his intent to see three Cubans compete in the decathlon at the 2012 Olympic Games.

He set a decathlon personal best of 8057 in his home town of Havana in March 2008, breaking the 8000-point barrier for the first time. Díaz's first appearance on the global stage came soon after at 2008 Summer Olympics, but he did not compete in his specialist event but rather as part of Cuba's 4×400 metres relay team with Yunier Pérez, William Collazo and Omar Cisneros. The team failed to progress beyond the heats stage of the competition. He won his first senior medal the following year in Havana at the 2009 Central American and Caribbean Championships in Athletics, finishing as runner-up behind compatriot Leonel Suárez but managing to score over 8000 points for the second time in his career with a final total of 8013.

Díaz was selected to represent Cuba in the decathlon at the 2009 World Championships in Athletics along with Suárez and García. He was in second place after five events (having scored 4512 points) and although he had slipped to ninth place by the end of the competition, he managed to significantly improve his personal best to 8357 points. This score gave him eleventh place on the season's decathlon rankings.

== Personal bests ==
Event	Result	Venue	Date
Outdoor
100 m	10.66 s (wind: +0.2 m/s)	Berlin, Germany	19 Aug 2009
Long jump	8.02 m (wind: +0.3 m/s)	Havana, Cuba	22 Feb 2007
Shot put	15.56 m	Havana, Cuba	2 Mar 2012
High jump	2.05 m	Havana, Cuba	7 Mar 2008
400 m	46.15 s	Berlin, Germany	19 Aug 2009
110 m hurdles	14.49 s (wind: -0.8 m/s)	Havana, Cuba	4 Jul 2009
Discus throw	45.50 m	Ratingen, Germany	15 Jun 2012
Pole vault	4.60 m	Berlin, Germany	20 Aug 2009
Javelin throw	62.14 m	Havana, Cuba	6 May 2011
1500 m	4:30.16 min	Ponce, Puerto Rico	27 May 2007
Decathlon	8357 pts	Berlin, Germany	19/20 Aug 2009
Indoor
60 m	6.91 s	Sumy, Ukraine	17 Feb 2010
Long jump	7.62 m	Tallinn, Estonia	12 Feb 2010
Shot put	15.11 m	Sumy, Ukraine	17 Feb 2010
High jump	1.99 m	Sumy, Ukraine	17 Feb 2010
60 m hurdles	8.19 s	Sumy, Ukraine	17 Feb 2010
Pole vault	4.25 m	Tallinn, Estonia	8 Feb 2009
1000 m	2:41.25 min	Tallinn, Estonia	13 Feb 2010
Heptathlon	5831 pts	Sumy, Ukraine	17/18 Feb 2010

== Competition record ==
Year	Competition	Venue	Position	Event	Notes
2005	Pan American Junior Championships	Windsor, Canada	2nd	Decathlon	7290 pts
2007	NACAC Combined Events Championships	Santo Domingo, Dominican Republic	3rd	Decathlon	7816 pts
2008	Summer Olympics	Beijing, China	7th (heats)	4 × 400 m relay	3:02.24
2009	Americas Combined Events Cup	Havana, Cuba	2nd	Decathlon	7920 pts
2009	CAC Championships	Havana, Cuba	2nd	Decathlon	8013 pts
2009	World Championships	Berlin, Germany	9th	Decathlon	8357 pts
2011	ALBA Games	Barquisimeto, Venezuela	1st	Decathlon	7800 pts
2011	Pan American Games	Guadalajara, Mexico	19th (q)	Long jump	7.21 m A (wind: -0.2 m/s)
2011	Pan American Games	Guadalajara, Mexico	1st (h)	4 × 400 m relay	3:04.33 min A
2014	Pan American Sports Festival	Mexico City, Mexico	3rd	Long jump	7.83 m A (wind: 1.3 m/s)
2014	Central American and Caribbean Games	Xalapa, Mexico	3rd	Long jump	7.66 m A (wind: -0.9 m/s)
2015	Pan American Games	Toronto, Canada	6th	Long jump	7.90 m (w)
