= Yarianny Argüelles =

Portuguese athlete

Yariadmis Arguelles
Personal information
- Nationality: Portuguese
- Born: 18 April 1984 (age 42) Jovellanos, Cuba

Sport
- Country: Portugal
- Sport: Track and field
- Event: Long jump
Medal record
Representing Cuba
Pan American Games
Bronze medal – third place	2003 Santo Domingo	Long jump

Yariadmis Argüelles Baró (born 14 April 1984) is a Cuban athlete who specialises in the long jump. She has qualified for 2016 Summer Olympics.

== Personal bests ==
=== Outdoor ===
Event	Record	Wind	Venue	Date
200 metres	23.96	+1.8	Cali	4 July 2008
800 metres	2:26.4		La Habana	14 February 2009
100 metres hurdles	13.67	-1.7	La Habana	6 March 2009
High jump	1.90		La Habana	17 March 2005
Long jump	6.70	-0.1	Medellín	10 May 2015
Shot put	12.05		La Habana	6 March 2009
Javelin throw	40.77		Cali	5 July 2008
Heptathlon	5982		La Habana	30 May 2009
