= Julio Jiménez (politician) =

Bolivian politician (1964–2020)

Julio Sabas Jiménez Llanque (5 December 1964 – 6 July 2020) was a Bolivian politician who served as a Deputy since 22 January 2015. He died from COVID-19 in Cochabamba during the COVID-19 pandemic in Bolivia, on 6 July 2020, aged 55.
