= Alexis Chivás =

Cuban decathlete

Personal information
- Full name: Alexei Chivás Hechavarría
- Born: November 7, 1983 (age 42) Santiago de Cuba, Santiago de Cuba
- Height: 1.80 m (5 ft 11 in)
- Weight: 84 kg (185 lb)

Sport
- Country: Cuba
- Sport: Athletics
- Updated on 2 June 2013

Alexis Chivás Hechavarría (also Alexei or Alexey; born 7 November 1983 in Santiago de Cuba; another source reports 1 December 1983) is a Cuban decathlete. His personal best score is 7956 points, achieved in March 2008 in Havana. He also became Cuban champion in 2005.

== Personal best ==
- Decathlon 7956 pts – (Cuba) Havana, 8 March 2008

== Achievements ==
Year	Competition	Venue	Position	Event	Notes
Representing Cuba
2005	Central American and Caribbean Championships	Nassau, Bahamas	3rd	Decathlon	7624 pts
2006	Central American and Caribbean Games	Cartagena, Colombia	1st	Decathlon	7551 pts
2007	ALBA Games	Caracas, Venezuela	2nd	Decathlon	7061 pts
2007	Universiade	Bangkok, Thailand	6th	Decathlon	7685 pts
2008	Pan American Combined Events Championships	Santo Domingo, Dominican Republic	–	Decathlon	DNF
2009	Americas Combined Events Cup	Havana, Cuba	3rd	Decathlon	7808 pts
2009	Central American and Caribbean Championships	Havana, Cuba	5th	Decathlon	6979 pts
2010	Ibero-American Championships	San Fernando, Spain	4th	Decathlon	6971 pts
