= Virginia Miller (heptathlete) =

American heptathlete

Personal information
- Born: January 12, 1979 (age 46) Huntsville, Alabama, United States

Sport
- Sport: Track and field
- Club: Arkansas Lady Razorbacks

Virginia "Gi-Gi" Miller-Johnson (born January 12, 1979) is a world-class heptathlete and former US champion.

== Collegiate career ==
Competing for the Arkansas Lady Razorbacks in 2000 and 2001, Miller set school records in the 100-meter hurdles, high jump, shot put, 200-meters, 800-meters, long jump and heptathlon.

In her first season, Miller finished 2nd in the heptathlon at the 2000 NCAA Outdoor Championships.

During her second college season, Miller won the triple jump at the 2001 NCAA Indoor Championships That same year, she won the heptathlon at the Southeastern Conference Outdoor Championships.

== Professional career ==
Following her college season, Miller finished 3rd in the heptathlon at the 2001 USA Outdoor Championships. She finished 2nd in 2005 and won the title at the 2006 event.

In her efforts to make the US Olympic team, she finished 6th in 2004 and 4th in 2008, missing the team by ten points.

Miller-Johnson currently lives and trains in State College, Pennsylvania, with her husband and coach, Chris Johnson.

== Rankings ==
Miller-Johnson has been consistently ranked among the top heptathletes in the US by Track and Field News.

Year	Event	US rank
2000	Heptathlon	9th
2001	Heptathlon	3rd
2003	Heptathlon	6th
2004	Heptathlon	6th
2006	Heptathlon	1st
2007	Heptathlon	3rd
2008	Heptathlon	4th
