= Tracye Lawyer =

American heptathlete

Personal information
- Full name: Tracye Lawyer-Robinson
- Born: Tracye Lawyer; August 28, 1977 (age 49) Santa Barbara, California
- Height: 1.78 m (5 ft 10 in)

Sport
- Country: United States
- Sport: Athletics
- Event: Heptathlon
Medal record
Women's athletics
Representing United States
NACAC Championships
| Gold medal – first place | 2000 Monterrey, Mexico | Heptathlon |
| Silver medal – second place | 2005 San Juan, Puerto Rico | Heptathlon |
- Updated on 22 January 2016

Tracye Lawyer (born August 28, 1977, in Santa Barbara, California) is an American orthopaedic surgeon specializing in sports medicine and cartilage preservation, and a former heptathlete and soccer player. As an athlete she competed in the heptathlon for the United States, including at the NACAC Combined Events Championships, where she won a silver medal, and other international combined-events competitions. Competing for Stanford University, she was the 1999 NCAA heptathlon champion and a three-time All-American, and was named Pac-10 Player of the Year in women's soccer in 1998. She is a board-certified orthopaedic sports medicine surgeon who practises at Catalyst Orthopaedics & Sports Medicine in Boise, Idaho.

== Prep ==
Lawyer attended Cate School in Carpinteria, California, where she won the CIF California State Meet Championship in the high jump as a sophomore in 1993. She also finished third in 1994 and second in 1995.

== NCAA ==
Next she went to Stanford University, where she achieved the 1999 NCAA Women's Outdoor Track and Field Championship in the heptathlon. Previous to that she had been third in 1997 and second in 1998. During that period she won the PAC-10 Championships three years in a row and set the still standing Stanford record in the event. She also played soccer at Stanford as a midfielder.

== International Success ==
A noted first day specialist, she finished 7th at the 2000 U.S. Olympic Trials. Four years later she finished eighth.

== Post competition ==
After retiring from international competition, Lawyer served as an assistant coach at Stanford University.

== Medical career ==
Lawyer later completed her medical degree at Ohio State University College of Medicine, followed by an orthopaedic surgery residency at the University of Mississippi Medical Center and a sports medicine fellowship at the University of Pittsburgh Medical Center (UPMC). During her fellowship she worked with the Pittsburgh Steelers of the National Football League and the Pittsburgh Penguins of the National Hockey League.

Lawyer is board certified in orthopaedic surgery and fellowship trained in orthopaedic sports medicine. Her clinical practice focuses on arthroscopic and open surgery of the shoulder, elbow and knee, with particular emphasis on cartilage preservation and restoration, anterior cruciate ligament (ACL) reconstruction, meniscus repair and transplantation, multi-ligament knee reconstruction, and shoulder arthroplasty.

She practises in Boise, Idaho, at Catalyst Orthopaedics & Sports Medicine. Her research focuses on cartilage biology and regenerative techniques, and she has authored peer-reviewed publications and presented at national orthopaedic and sports medicine meetings.

== Research ==
Lawyer's research has focused on cartilage biology and regenerative techniques in the knee, shoulder and elbow. Her work on chondrocytes and cartilage regeneration has been published in peer-reviewed journals and presented at national orthopaedic and bioengineering meetings.
