= Leonel Suárez =

Cuban decathlete (born 1987)

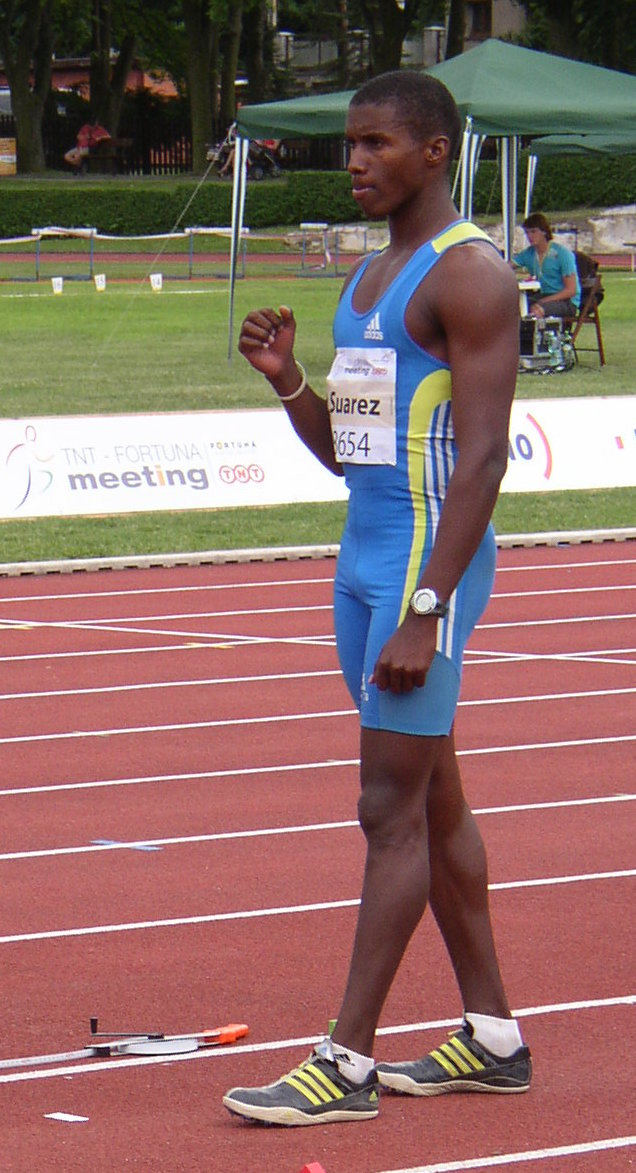
- Leonel Suárez at the 2011 TNT – Fortuna Meeting in Kladno

Personal information
- Full name: Leonel Suárez Fajardo
- Nationality: Cuba
- Born: 1 September 1987 (age 38) Holguin, Cuba
- Height: 1.80 m (5 ft 11 in)
- Weight: 78 kg (172 lb)

Sport
- Sport: Athletics
- Event: Decathlon / Heptathlon
Medal record
Men's athletics
Representing Cuba
Olympic Games
Bronze medal – third place	2008 Beijing	Decathlon
Bronze medal – third place	2012 London	Decathlon
World Championships
Silver medal – second place	2009 Berlin	Decathlon
Bronze medal – third place	2011 Daegu	Decathlon
Pan American Games
Gold medal – first place	2011 Guadalajara	Decathlon
CAC Championships
Gold medal – first place	2009 Havana	Decathlon
- Updated on 4 July 2013

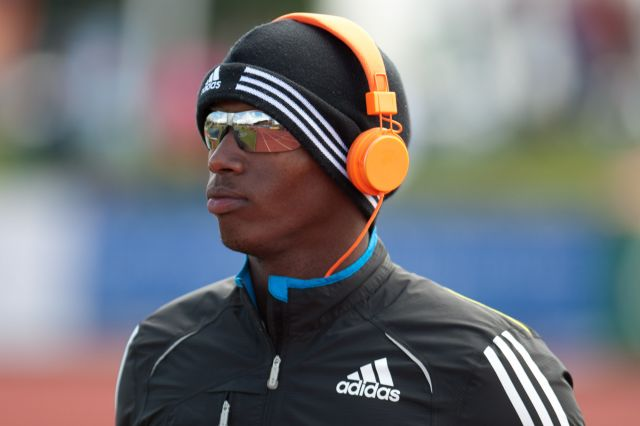
Leonel Suárez during the 2011 Hypo-Meeting

Leonel Suárez Fajardo (born September 1, 1987) is a decathlete from Cuba. He was a bronze medalist in the event at the 2012 Summer Olympics, 2008 Summer Olympics and a silver medalist at the 2009 World Championships. He won a third consecutive global medal at the 2011 World Championships in Athletics, taking bronze.

He was born in Santiago de Cuba. His personal best for the decathlon is 8654 points (which set in Havana, winning the 2009 Central American and Caribbean Championships).

== Career ==
Suárez was fourth at the 2007 Pan American Games. In 2008, he was also fourth at Hypo-Meeting (setting a national record of 8366 pts) and finished as runner-up in the IAAF World Combined Events Challenge that year. He scored a gold medal at the 2009 Central American and Caribbean Championships in Athletics.

He competed at the 2010 IAAF World Indoor Championships, but only managed seventh place. In the outdoor season, he was runner-up at the 2010 Multistars meeting in Desenzano del Garda, finishing with 8112 points behind American Jake Arnold. He was third at the Hypo-Meeting at the end of May, but he reached the top of the podium at the Décastar competition in Talence with a total of 8328 points.

At the 2011 Hypo Meeting he threw a meeting record of 75.49 m in the javelin, although his final score of 8440 points for second place was some distance behind the winner Trey Hardee. After a modest start at the 2011 TNT - Fortuna Meeting, he began the second day in ninth place but he pulled himself back into contention and, helped by a pole vault best of 5.00 m, he took the men's title with a total of 8231 points. At the 2011 World Championships in Athletics in August, Suárez won the bronze medal in decathlon with a final points tally of 8501. Although he had not won all of is outings, his consistent high scores over the three meetings earned him the IAAF Combined Events Challenge title that year.

== Personal best ==
- Decathlon: 8654 pts – Havana, 4 July 2009

== International competitions ==
Year	Competition	Venue	Position	Event	Notes
Representing Cuba
2005	ALBA Games	Havana, Cuba	4th	Decathlon	7048 pts
2007	NACAC Combined Events Championships	Santo Domingo, Dominican Republic	2nd	Decathlon	7843 pts
2007	Pan American Games	Rio de Janeiro, Brazil	4th	Decathlon	7936 pts
2008	Olympic Games	Beijing, PR China	3rd	Decathlon	8527 pts NR
2009	Central American and Caribbean Championships	Havana, Cuba	1st	Decathlon	8654 pts NR AR
2009	World Championships	Berlin, Germany	2nd	Decathlon	8640 pts
2010	World Indoor Championships	Doha, Qatar	7th	Heptathlon	5764 pts
2011	World Championships	Daegu, South Korea	3rd	Decathlon	8501 pts
2011	Pan American Games	Guadalajara, Mexico	1st	Decathlon	8374 pts
2012	Olympic Games	London, United Kingdom	3rd	Decathlon	8523 pts
2013	World Championships	Moscow, Russia	10th	Decathlon	8317 pts
2015	Pan American Combined Events Cup	Ottawa, Canada	—	Decathlon	DNF
2015	Pan American Games	Toronto, Canada	–	Decathlon	DNF
2016	Olympic Games	Rio de Janeiro, Brazil	6th	Decathlon	8460 pts
2017	World Championships	London, United Kingdom	–	Decathlon	DNF
2018	Central American and Caribbean Games	Barranquilla, Colombia	1st	Decathlon	8026 pts
2019	Pan American Games	Lima, Peru	5th	Decathlon	7799 pts
