= Christopher Randolph (decathlete) =

American decathlete

Christopher "Chris" James Randolph (born April 25, 1984 in Lompoc, California) is an American Decathlete. Randolph is 6 ft 2 in and 190 lbs, with a high score in the decathlon of 8066 points.

Randolph graduated from Denver Christian High School where he competed in the high jump and 4 x 400 meter relay. He attended Seattle Pacific University where he first competed in the decathlon. As a sophomore in 2004, Randolph placed third in the NCAA Division II decathlon, a competition he won in 2005 and 2006. He broke six of the ten records for the Great Northwest Athletic Conference (GNAC) decathlon events (five of which he still holds) as well as the highest recorded decathlon score to date. By age 22, Randolph had earned the titles of NCAA Division II Field Athlete of the Year, Seattle Pacific's Male Athlete of the Year and the GNAC Co-Male Athlete of the Year.

Randolph has competed internationally for team USA in the decathlon in Germany, the Dominican Republic, and Jamaica. In 2007, he placed fifth at the annual Thorpe Cup in Marburg, Germany with a score of 7502. Randolph placed third at the North American, Central American and Caribbean Athletic Association (NACAC) Combined Events Championships in the Dominican Republic in 2008 with a score of 7747. At the 2009 USA Outdoor Track & Field Championships, Randolph placed fourth. In May 2011, he placed fourth at the NACAC Combined Events Championships held in Kingston, Jamaica with a score of 7359. In the 2011 USA Outdoor Track & Field Championships, in Eugene Oregon, he placed fifth. Randolph's strongest events of the ten are the high jump and long jump, with personal bests of 2.07 and 7.35 meters, respectively. Randolph was a recipient of the USA Track & Field Foundation's Elite Athlete Grant in 2008, 2009 and 2010.

== Personal Bests ==
- 100 Meters: 11.25 seconds
- Long Jump: 7.35 meters
- Shot Put: 14.05 meters
- High Jump: 2.07 meters
- 400 Meters: 48.61 seconds
- 110 Meter Hurdles: 14.81 seconds
- Discus Throw: 46.06 meters
- Pole Vault: 4.90 meters
- Javelin Throw: 61.54 meters
- 1500 Meters: 4:20:88
- Decathlon: 8066 points
- 400m (Open): 48.27 seconds
- 800m (Open): 1:57.51 seconds
