= Ryan Harlan =

American decathlete (born 1981)

- Harlan at the Awty International School

Personal information
- Born: April 25, 1981 (age 44) Texas, U.S.
- Occupation: decathlete

Jon "Ryan" Harlan (born April 25, 1981) is an American decathlete, who also coaches at the Awty International School.

== Early life ==
Harlan went to Midway High School in Hewitt, Texas. He later graduated from Rice University in 2004, majoring in Bachelor of Arts in Managerial Studies and Studio Art. During his time at Rice, he was the 2000 Junior National Decathlon Champion and the 2004 NCAA National Decathlon Champion.

== Rice University honors ==
- In 2001, he received the Stancliff Award for academic achievement and outstanding track and field performance.
- In 2004, he received the Emmett Brunson Award for excellence in track
- In 2001-02, he was awarded annually to the member of the Rice University Men's Track and Field Team judged to be the "Most Versatile" winning performer while best exemplifying the winning team attitude and high moral character of Fred Wolcott both on and off the field
- On October 25, 2013, he was inducted into the Rice University Athletic Hall of Fame. (Fred Wolcott Award)

== Activities and honors ==
- Before Ryan's success started to rise, he became the Junior National Champion in the Decathlon 2000.
- Prior to Ryan's graduation from Rice, he was featured as a "Face in the Crowd" in Sports Illustrated on March 24, 2003.
- In 2004, he was declared NCAA National Decathlon Champion.
- In 2005 and 2006, he was USA National Indoor Heptathlon Champion and was ranked in the top 10 decathletes in the world both years.
- In 2006, Ryan received 2nd Place Decathlon finish at the USA Outdoor Championships.
- Also in 2006, he was the USA Track and Field Elite Athlete Grant Recipient.
- Later, in January 2007, Ryan was featured in the Houston Modern Luxury Magazine.
- Still in 2007, he was the NACAC (North America, Central America, Caribbean) Multi Event Championships Champion.
- Ryan was a member of the Pan-Am Games USA Team 2007 in Rio de Janeiro, Brazil.
- In 2011, Ryan was the IAAF World Championship USA Team 2011 in Daegu, South Korea.
- Following that, Ryan was the 2nd-place finisher in the Decathlon at the USA Outdoor Championships.
- Ryan also has an IMDb page based on his roles as a stunt man in two movies, one in 2010, and one in 2014.

== The Awty International School ==
Ryan Harlan joined the Awty International School Athletic Staff in 2011, with 8 years of experience in Track and Field, and bringing a focus on correct technique and fitness for the students. As of 2023, he is still currently coaching the students of the Awty International school.
