= Chris Boyles =

American decathlete

Personal information
- Nationality: American
- Citizenship: USA
- Born: May 2, 1980 (age 45) Carlisle, Pennsylvania

Sport
- Sport: Track and Field
- Event: Decathlon

Achievements and titles
- World finals: 6th at the 2007 Pan American Games held in Rio de Janeiro, Brazil. He finished 4th at the 2006 US Championships in Indianapolis and 5th in the 2007 Championships.

Christopher David Boyles (born 2 May 1980 in Carlisle, Pennsylvania) is an American decathlete.

He finished 6th at the 2007 Pan American Games held in Rio de Janeiro, Brazil. He finished 4th at the 2006 US Championships in Indianapolis and 5th in the 2007 Championships.

== Biography ==
Boyles' personal best in decathlon is 7855 points, achieved in May 2006 in Desenzano, Italy.

Boyles was among five American athletes whose visas were revoked by the Chinese government just before the 2008 Summer Olympic Games because of their association with Team Darfur, a group of athletes devoted to raising awareness of humanitarian crises related to the War in Darfur.

Boyles currently works as an assistant track & field coach for his alma mater; Messiah College.
