= 2009 in the decathlon =

This page lists the World Best Year Performance in the year 2009 in the men's decathlon. The main event during this season were the 2009 World Athletics Championships in Berlin, Germany, where the competition was held on August 19 and August 20, 2009.

== Records ==
Standing records prior to the 2009 season in track and field
World Record	Roman Šebrle (CZE)	9026	May 27, 2001	Götzis, Austria

== 2009 World Year Ranking ==
Rank	Points	Athlete	Venue	Date	Note
1	8790	Trey Hardee (US)	Berlin, Germany	2009-08-20	PB
2	8654	Leonel Suárez (CUB)	Havana, Cuba	2009-07-04	NR
3	8569	Tom Pappas (US)	Marburg, Germany	2009-08-09	
4	8528	Aleksandr Pogorelov (RUS)	Berlin, Germany	2009-08-20	
5	8522	Michael Schrader (GER)	Götzis, Austria	2009-05-31	
6	8496	Yordanis García (CUB)	Havana, Cuba	2009-05-30	
7	8479	Oleksiy Kasyanov (UKR)	Berlin, Germany	2009-08-20	
8	8454	Aleksey Sysoyev (RUS)	Berlin, Germany	2009-08-20	
9	8439	Pascal Behrenbruch (GER)	Berlin, Germany	2009-08-20	
10	8406	Niklas Wiberg (SWE)	Berlin, Germany	2009-08-20	NR
11	8357	Yunior Díaz (CUB)	Berlin, Germany	2009-08-20	
12	8348	Roman Šebrle (CZE)	Götzis, Austria	2009-05-31	
13	8336	Andrei Krauchanka (BLR)	Szczecin, Poland	2009-06-28	
14	8295	Norman Müller (GER)	Ratingen, Germany	2009-06-21	
15	8286	Aleksey Kasyanov (UKR)	Götzis, Austria	2009-05-31	
16	8255	Mikk Pahapill (EST)	Talence, France	2009-09-20	
17	8239	Romain Barras (FRA)	Arles, France	2009-06-14	
18	8171	Larbi Bouraâda (ALG)	Berlin, Germany	2009-08-20	AR
19	8157	Maurice Smith (JAM)	Kladno, Czech Republic	2009-06-24	
20	8146	Willem Coertzen (RSA)	Berlin, Germany	2009-08-20	NR
21	8119	Andres Raja (EST)	Berlin, Germany	2009-08-20	
22	8113	Vasiliy Kharlamov (RUS)	Szczecin, Poland	2009-06-28	
23	8112	Eelco Sintnicolaas (NED)	Kaunas, Lithuania	2009-07-17	
24	8091	Ashton Eaton (US)	Eugene, United States	2009-05-10	
25	8083	Eugène Martineau (NED)	Götzis, Austria	2009-05-31	

== See also ==
- 2009 Hypo-Meeting
