= 2011 Hypo-Meeting =

The 37th edition of the annual Hypo-Meeting took place on May 28 and May 29, 2011 in Götzis, Austria. The track and field competition, featuring a men's decathlon and a women's heptathlon event was part of the 2011 IAAF World Combined Events Challenge. Trey Hardee and Jessica Ennis led the men's and women's competition, respectively, after the first day. Ennis (6790 points) and Trey Hardee (8689 points) were the winners of the events overall.

== Men's Decathlon ==
=== Schedule ===
May 28
1. 100 m
2. Long Jump
3. Shot Put
4. High Jump
5. 400 m

May 29
6. 110 m hurdles
7. Discus Throw
8. Pole Vault
9. Javelin Throw
10. 1,500 m

=== Records ===
| World Record | Roman Šebrle (CZE) | 9026 | May 27, 2001 | Götzis, Austria |
| Event Record | Roman Šebrle (CZE) | 9026 | May 27, 2001 | Götzis, Austria |

=== Results ===
The best mark recorded in each event is highlighted in yellow

| Rank | Athlete | Decathlon | | | | | | | | | | Points |
| Rank | Athlete | 1 | 2 | 3 | 4 | 5 | 6 | 7 | 8 | 9 | 10 | Points |
|---|---|---|---|---|---|---|---|---|---|---|---|---|
| 1 | Trey Hardee (USA) | 10.44 | 7.88 | 15.63 | 2.00 | 48.12 | 13.73 | 45.20 | 5.06 | 63.33 | 4:46.88 | 8689 |
| 2 | Leonel Suárez (CUB) | 11.06 | 7.21 | 13.48 | 2.06 | 48.85 | 14.35 | 44.57 | 4.86 | 75.49 | 4:25.33 | 8440 |
| 3 | Mikk Pahapill (EST) | 11.08 | 7.39 | 15.48 | 2.03 | 50.95 | 14.70 | 48.79 | 5.06 | 69.53 | 4:39.41 | 8398 |
| 4 | Eelco Sintnicolaas (NED) | 10.84 | 7.40 | 14.31 | 1.91 | 48.69 | 14.57 | 41.74 | 5.36 | 59.48 | 4:22.29 | 8304 |
| 5 | Jan Felix Knobel (GER) | 11.14 | 7.23 | 15.47 | 1.94 | 49.23 | 14.77 | 46.68 | 4.96 | 72.99 | 4:43.39 | 8288 |
| 6 | Oleksiy Kasyanov (UKR) | 10.75 | 7.38 | 14.08 | 2.03 | 48.11 | 14.26 | 46.94 | 4.76 | 51.62 | 4:27.14 | 8251 |
| 7 | Rico Freimuth (GER) | 10.79 | 7.11 | 14.65 | 1.94 | 48.22 | 14.05 | 46.25 | 4.76 | 60.33 | 4:44.39 | 8158 |
| 8 | Brent Newdick (NZL) | 10.95 | 7.45 | 14.17 | 1.94 | 49.61 | 14.76 | 46.65 | 4.66 | 63.03 | 4:32.50 | 8114 |
| 9 | Ingmar Vos (NED) | 10.85 | 7.45 | 13.94 | 2.00 | 51.12 | 14.45 | 41.51 | 4.66 | 65.28 | 4:27.73 | 8105 |
| 10 | Pascal Behrenbruch (GER) | 10.99 | 6.87 | 16.44 | 1.97 | 50.31 | 14.60 | 47.01 | 4.86 | 64.60 | 4:56.12 | 8064 |
| 11 | Hans Van Alphen (BEL) | 11.10 | 7.50 | 13.35 | 2.00 | 49.58 | 14.96 | 46.32 | 4.46 | 60.85 | 4:21.86 | 8045 |
| 12 | Norman Müller (GER) | 11.07 | 7.30 | 14.82 | 2.00 | 49.43 | 14.98 | 38.79 | 4.76 | 58.64 | 4:22.09 | 7997 |
| 13 | Thomas Van Der Plaetsen (BEL) | 11.31 | 7.42 | 12.80 | 2.09 | 49.60 | 14.65 | 36.87 | 5.06 | 60.13 | 4:32.52 | 7973 |
| 14 | Dominik Distelberger (AUT) | 10.79 | 7.62 | 11.66 | 1.94 | 48.16 | 14.28 | 39.69 | 4.76 | 50.26 | 4:36.05 | 7840 |
| 15 | Simon Walter (SUI) | 11.20 | 7.02 | 13.38 | 2.00 | 49.27 | 15.22 | 43.19 | 4.86 | 57.39 | 4:54.46 | 7689 |
| 16 | Darius Draudvila (LTU) | 10.95 | 6.94 | 15.27 | 1.94 | 49.43 | 14.53 | 45.73 | 4.56 | 50.14 | 5:13.11 | 7612 |
| 17 | Stephen Cain (AUS) | 11.39 | 6.76 | 12.98 | 1.97 | 51.20 | 15.05 | 41.01 | 4.96 | 57.85 | 4:42.40 | 7532 |
| 18 | Matthias Prey (GER) | 11.27 | 7.65 | 14.34 | 1.85 | 50.69 | 14.81 | 47.87 | NM | 55.89 | 4:31.45 | 7085 |
| 19 | Jake Arnold (USA) | 11.23 | 6.30 | 14.37 | 1.91 | 50.36 | 14.66 | 44.17 | 4.96 | 56.45 | DNF | 6958 |
| 20 | Yunior Díaz (CUB) | 11.02 | 7.19 | 13.87 | 1.97 | 47.53 | DNF | 43.60 | 4.36 | 55.45 | 4:39.71 | 6952 |
| — | Jamie Adjetey-Nelson (CAN) | 10.84 | 7.26 | 14.79 | 1.97 | 49.34 | 14.76 | NM | 4.46 | DNS | | DNF |
| — | Yordani García (CUB) | 10.86 | 6.95 | 14.46 | 2.00 | 48.72 | 14.17 | 43.52 | NM | DNS | | DNF |
| — | Roland Schwarzl (AUT) | 11.38 | 7.22 | 13.78 | 1.85 | DNF | 14.67 | 45.41 | 5.16 | DNS | | DNF |
| — | Mihail Dudaš (SRB) | 10.91 | 7.30 | 13.69 | 1.97 | DNS | | | | | | DNF |
| — | Pelle Rietveld (NED) | 10.75 | 6.98 | 14.20 | 1.82 | DNS | | | | | | DNF |
| — | Willem Coertzen (RSA) | 11.12 | 6.69 | DNS | | | | | | | | DNF |
| — | Andres Raja (EST) | DNF | DNS | | | | | | | | | DNF |

== Women's heptathlon ==
=== Schedule ===
May 29
1. 100 m hurdles
2. High Jump
3. Shot Put
4. 200 m

May 30
5. Long Jump
6. Javelin Throw
7. 800 m

=== Records ===
| World Record | Jackie Joyner-Kersee (USA) | 7291 | September 24, 1988 | Seoul, South Korea |
| Event Record | Sabine Braun (GER) | 6985 | May 31, 1992 | Götzis, Austria |

=== Results ===
The best mark recorded in each event is highlighted in yellow

| Rank | Athlete | Heptathlon | | | | | | | Points |
| Rank | Athlete | 1 | 2 | 3 | 4 | 5 | 6 | 7 | Points |
|---|---|---|---|---|---|---|---|---|---|
| 1 | Jessica Ennis-Hill (GBR) | 13.03 | 1.91 | 13.94 | 23.11 | 6.37 | 43.83 | 2:08.46 | 6790 |
| 2 | Tatyana Chernova (RUS) | 13.79 | 1.79 | 12.67 | 23.51 | 6.82 | 47.07 | 2:13.36 | 6539 |
| 3 | Antoinette Nana Djimou Ida (FRA) | 13.48 | 1.76 | 14.44 | 24.36 | 6.29 | 51.11 | 2:18.99 | 6409 |
| 4 | Jennifer Oeser (GER) | 13.67 | 1.82 | 13.73 | 24.57 | 6.26 | 47.21 | 2:15.14 | 6359 |
| 5 | Jessica Zelinka (CAN) | 13.21 | 1.79 | 13.03 | 23.71 | 6.09 | 41.27 | 2:08.51 | 6353 |
| 6 | Natallia Dobrynska (UKR) | 14.04 | 1.82 | 15.28 | 25.20 | 6.25 | 46.31 | 2:15.09 | 6332 |
| 7 | Austra Skujytė (LTU) | 14.38 | 1.85 | 16.23 | 25.58 | 6.10 | 47.66 | 2:24.32 | 6204 |
| 8 | Dafne Schippers (NED) | 13.60 | 1.70 | 13.89 | 22.90 | 6.13 | 38.20 | 2:15.74 | 6172 |
| 9 | Lyudmyla Yosypenko (UKR) | 13.93 | 1.76 | 13.02 | 24.53 | 6.06 | 48.63 | 2:19.65 | 6105 |
| 10 | Yana Maksimava (BLR) | 14.19 | 1.88 | 13.50 | 25.24 | 5.87 | 42.19 | 2:13.31 | 6094 |
| 11 | Maren Schwerdtner (GER) | 13.81 | 1.73 | 13.67 | 24.44 | 6.16 | 43.10 | 2:21.27 | 6039 |
| 12 | Remona Fransen (NED) | 14.02 | 1.79 | 12.92 | 24.55 | 6.09 | 36.58 | 2:11.71 | 6012 |
| 13 | Claudia Rath (GER) | 14.30 | 1.76 | 12.70 | 24.82 | 6.00 | 37.23 | 2:12.84 | 5861 |
| 14 | Ellen Sprunger (SUI) | 13.95 | 1.70 | 12.07 | 24.07 | 5.64 | 42.38 | 2:13.80 | 5844 |
| 15 | Katerina Cachová (CZE) | 14.23 | 1.76 | 11.55 | 24.96 | 5.94 | 42.17 | 2:15.02 | 5827 |
| 16 | Ida Marcussen (NOR) | 14.68 | 1.70 | 12.26 | 25.81 | 5.99 | 46.47 | 2:12.32 | 5800 |
| 17 | Bettie Wade (USA) | 13.87 | 1.76 | 12.94 | 24.86 | 5.91 | 35.97 | 2:19.69 | 5788 |
| 18 | Léa Sprunger (SUI) | 14.31 | 1.73 | 12.30 | 23.81 | 5.91 | 38.09 | 2:30.07 | 5651 |
| 19 | Yasmina Omrani (FRA) | 13.97 | 1.76 | 12.80 | 24.35 | 5.27 | 37.34 | 2:23.83 | 5594 |
| — | Lilli Schwarzkopf (GER) | 14.12 | 1.73 | 13.82 | 25.41 | 5.75 | 50.24 | DNS | DNF |
| — | Yvonne Van Langen (NED) | 13.58 | 1.73 | 13.33 | 24.17 | DNS | | | DNF |
| — | Kaie Kand (EST) | 14.44 | 1.73 | 13.14 | DNS | | | | DNF |
| — | Marina Goncharova (RUS) | 14.67 | DNS | DNS | | | | | DNF |
| — | Margaret Simpson (GHA) | 14.03 | DNS | | | | | | DNF |
