= 2009 World Championships in Athletics – Men's decathlon =

The men's decathlon at the 2009 World Championships in Athletics was held at the Olympic Stadium on August 19 and August 20. The competition is notable for having the highest number of competitors (38) and the highest proportion of athletes (almost 89.5 %) finishing the competition in the World Championships history.

== Medalists ==
Gold	Trey Hardee; United States (USA)
Silver	Leonel Suárez; Cuba (CUB)
Bronze	Oleksiy Kasyanov; Ukraine (UKR)

== Records ==
Prior to the competition, the following records were as follows.

World record	Roman Šebrle (CZE)	9026	Götzis, Austria	27 May 2001
Championship record	Tomáš Dvořák (CZE)	8902	Edmonton, Canada	7 August 2001
World leading	Leonel Suárez (CUB)	8654	Havana, Cuba	4 July 2009
African record	Willem Coertzen (RSA)	8054	Götzis, Austria	31 May 2009
Asian record	Dmitriy Karpov (KAZ)	8725	Athens, Greece	24 August 2004
North American record	Dan O'Brien (USA)	8891	Talence, France	5 September 1992
South American record	Tito Steiner (ARG)	8291	Provo, United States	23 June 1983
European record	Roman Šebrle (CZE)	9026	Götzis, Austria	27 May 2001
Oceanian record	Jagan Hames (AUS)	8490	Kuala Lumpur, Malaysia	18 September 1998

== Qualification standards ==
A standard	B standard
8000pts	7730pts

== Schedule ==
Date	Time	Round
August 19, 2009	10:05	100 metres
August 19, 2009	11:15	Long jump
August 19, 2009	13:00	Shot put
August 19, 2009	18:05	High jump
August 19, 2009	20:45	400 metres
August 20, 2009	10:05	110 metres hurdles
August 20, 2009	11:10	Discus throw
August 20, 2009	14:25	Pole vault
August 20, 2009	18:05	Javelin throw
August 20, 2009	21:15	1500 metres
August 20, 2009	21:15	Final standings

== Results ==
=== 100 metres ===
Rank	Heat	Athlete	Nationality	Time	Points	Notes
1	3	Trey Hardee	United States	10.45	987	SB
2	3	Ashton Eaton	United States	10.53	968	
3	3	Yordanis García	Cuba	10.60	952	PB
4	3	Oleksiy Kasyanov	Ukraine	10.63	945	
5	3	Yunior Díaz	Cuba	10.66	938	PB
6	3	Larbi Bouraada	Algeria	10.68	933	PB
7	3	Andres Raja	Estonia	10.82	901	
8	1	Aleksey Sysoyev	Russia	10.85	894	SB
9	5	Willem Coertzen	South Africa	10.89	885	PB
10	4	Ingmar Vos	Netherlands	10.90	883	
11	4	Pascal Behrenbruch	Germany	10.92	878	
11	4	Daniel Almgren	Sweden	10.92	878	PB
13	2	Aleksandr Pogorelov	Russia	10.95	872	SB
14	5	Nicklas Wiberg	Sweden	10.96	870	PB
15	4	Norman Müller	Germany	11.01	858	
15	5	Mikk Pahapill	Estonia	11.01	858	PB
15	5	Jake Arnold	United States	11.01	858	PB
18	1	Dmitriy Karpov	Kazakhstan	11.02	856	SB
19	5	Yevhen Nikitin	Ukraine	11.04	852	
20	4	Simon Walter	Switzerland	11.05	850	
20	4	Eelco Sintnicolaas	Netherlands	11.05	850	
22	2	Moritz Cleve	Germany	11.06	847	PB
23	4	Mikk-Mihkel Arro	Estonia	11.11	836	
23	5	Brent Newdick	New Zealand	11.11	836	
25	1	Nadir El Fassi	France	11.12	834	SB
26	4	Leonel Suárez	Cuba	11.13	832	
27	5	Romain Barras	France	11.14	830	
28	5	Attila Szabó	Hungary	11.15	827	
29	2	Roman Šebrle	Czech Republic	11.16	825	
29	2	Daisuke Ikeda	Japan	11.16	825	
31	2	Andrei Krauchanka	Belarus	11.18	821	SB
31	2	Eugène Martineau	Netherlands	11.18	821	
33	1	Vasiliy Kharlamov	Russia	11.22	812	PB
34	1	Atis Vaisjuns	Latvia	11.27	801	SB
35	2	Agustín Félix	Spain	11.32	791	
36	1	Mateo Sossah	France	11.57	738	
37	1	Roland Schwarzl	Austria	11.69	713	
38	3	Maurice Smith	Jamaica	29.42	0	

=== Long jump ===
Rank	Group	Athlete	Nationality	Result	Points	Notes
1	A	Ashton Eaton	United States	7.85	1022	PB
2	A	Trey Hardee	United States	7.83	1017	PB
3	A	Oleksiy Kasyanov	Ukraine	7.80	1010	PB
3	A	Roman Šebrle	Czech Republic	7.80	1010	
5	A	Yunior Díaz	Cuba	7.72	990	
6	A	Andrei Krauchanka	Belarus	7.62	965	SB
7	B	Aleksandr Pogorelov	Russia	7.49	932	SB
8	B	Brent Newdick	New Zealand	7.42	915	PB
9	A	Eugène Martineau	Netherlands	7.41	913	PB
10	A	Andres Raja	Estonia	7.38	905	
10	A	Vasiliy Kharlamov	Russia	7.38	905	
12	A	Larbi Bouraada	Algeria	7.35	898	
12	A	Norman Müller	Germany	7.35	898	
14	A	Willem Coertzen	South Africa	7.32	891	
15	B	Daniel Almgren	Sweden	7.29	883	SB
16	B	Moritz Cleve	Germany	7.27	878	PB
17	B	Nadir El Fassi	France	7.26	876	SB
18	A	Nicklas Wiberg	Sweden	7.25	874	
19	A	Leonel Suárez	Cuba	7.24	871	
20	A	Ingmar Vos	Netherlands	7.21	864	
20	B	Simon Walter	Switzerland	7.21	864	PB
22	A	Agustín Félix	Spain	7.19	859	
23	B	Eelco Sintnicolaas	Netherlands	7.16	852	
24	B	Attila Szabó	Hungary	7.09	835	SB
24	B	Daisuke Ikeda	Japan	7.09	835	PB
24	B	Pascal Behrenbruch	Germany	7.09	835	SB
27	A	Yordanis García	Cuba	7.05	826	
28	B	Romain Barras	France	7.04	823	
28	B	Mateo Sossah	France	7.04	823	
30	A	Mikk-Mihkel Arro	Estonia	6.94	799	
30	B	Atis Vaisjuns	Latvia	6.94	799	
32	B	Yevhen Nikitin	Ukraine	6.92	795	
33	B	Aleksey Sysoyev	Russia	6.87	783	SB
34	B	Dmitriy Karpov	Kazakhstan	6.86	781	
35	B	Jake Arnold	United States	6.73	750	
	A	Roland Schwarzl	Austria	NM	0	
	B	Mikk Pahapill	Estonia	NM	0	
	B	Maurice Smith	Jamaica	DNS	0	

=== Shot put ===
Rank	Group	Athlete	Nationality	Result	Points	Notes
1	B	Aleksandr Pogorelov	Russia	16.65	891	PB
2	B	Aleksey Sysoyev	Russia	16.17	862	PB
3	B	Pascal Behrenbruch	Germany	15.77	837	
4	B	Oleksiy Kasyanov	Ukraine	15.72	834	PB
5	A	Trey Hardee	United States	15.33	810	PB
6	B	Dmitriy Karpov	Kazakhstan	15.27	806	
7	B	Leonel Suárez	Cuba	15.20	802	PB
8	B	Yordanis García	Cuba	15.15	799	
9	A	Nicklas Wiberg	Sweden	14.99	789	PB
10	B	Roman Šebrle	Czech Republic	14.98	788	
11	B	Vasiliy Kharlamov	Russia	14.95	787	
12	B	Norman Müller	Germany	14.93	785	
13	B	Romain Barras	France	14.78	776	
14	B	Yevhen Nikitin	Ukraine	14.69	771	
15	A	Andres Raja	Estonia	14.55	762	SB
16	B	Yunior Díaz	Cuba	14.54	761	
17	A	Mikk-Mihkel Arro	Estonia	14.42	754	SB
18	B	Mikk Pahapill	Estonia	14.38	752	
19	B	Brent Newdick	New Zealand	14.35	750	
20	A	Moritz Cleve	Germany	14.12	736	
21	B	Atis Vaisjuns	Latvia	14.07	733	
22	B	Jake Arnold	United States	13.97	727	
23	A	Andrei Krauchanka	Belarus	13.96	726	SB
24	B	Attila Szabó	Hungary	13.92	723	
25	A	Ingmar Vos	Netherlands	13.78	715	
26	A	Nadir El Fassi	France	13.62	705	
27	A	Daisuke Ikeda	Japan	13.43	693	PB
28	A	Daniel Almgren	Sweden	13.43	693	
29	A	Agustín Félix	Spain	13.23	681	
30	A	Willem Coertzen	South Africa	13.16	677	
31	A	Eelco Sintnicolaas	Netherlands	12.80	655	
32	A	Simon Walter	Switzerland	12.80	655	
33	A	Eugène Martineau	Netherlands	12.66	647	
34	A	Larbi Bouraada	Algeria	12.30	625	PB
35	A	Ashton Eaton	United States	12.26	622	
36	A	Mateo Sossah	France	11.97	605	
	A	Roland Schwarzl	Austria	DNS	0	

=== High jump ===
Rank	Group	Athlete	Nationality	Result	Points	Notes
1	B	Roman Šebrle	Czech Republic	2.11	906	SB
2	B	Leonel Suárez	Cuba	2.11	906	SB
3	B	Andrei Krauchanka	Belarus	2.11	906	SB
4	B	Yordanis García	Cuba	2.08	878	
5	B	Aleksandr Pogorelov	Russia	2.08	878	SB
6	B	Agustín Félix	Spain	2.08	878	PB
7	B	Mateo Sossah	France	2.05	850	
8	B	Dmitriy Karpov	Kazakhstan	2.05	850	SB
9	B	Larbi Bouraada	Algeria	2.05	850	
10	B	Nicklas Wiberg	Sweden	2.05	850	
11	A	Oleksiy Kasyanov	Ukraine	2.05	850	PB
12	B	Ingmar Vos	Netherlands	2.02	822	
13	B	Willem Coertzen	South Africa	2.02	822	
14	B	Aleksey Sysoyev	Russia	2.02	822	
15	A	Pascal Behrenbruch	Germany	2.02	822	SB
16	B	Ashton Eaton	United States	2.02	822	
17	A	Yunior Díaz	Cuba	2.02	822	SB
18	B	Romain Barras	France	1.99	794	
19	B	Nadir El Fassi	France	1.99	794	
19	B	Norman Müller	Germany	1.99	794	
21	A	Andres Raja	Estonia	1.99	794	
22	A	Atis Vaisjuns	Latvia	1.99	794	SB
22	A	Eugène Martineau	Netherlands	1.99	794	
24	B	Trey Hardee	United States	1.99	794	
25	A	Brent Newdick	New Zealand	1.99	794	PB
26	A	Daniel Almgren	Sweden	1.99	794	SB
27	B	Jake Arnold	United States	1.96	767	
28	A	Vasiliy Kharlamov	Russia	1.93	740	
29	A	Yevhen Nikitin	Ukraine	1.93	740	
30	A	Simon Walter	Switzerland	1.93	740	
31	A	Mikk-Mihkel Arro	Estonia	1.90	714	
32	A	Moritz Cleve	Germany	1.87	687	
32	A	Daisuke Ikeda	Japan	1.87	687	SB
34	A	Attila Szabó	Hungary	1.84	661	
35	A	Eelco Sintnicolaas	Netherlands	1.81	636	
	A	Mikk Pahapill	Estonia	DNS	0	

=== 400 metres ===
Rank	Heat	Athlete	Nationality	Time	Points	Notes
1	2	Yunior Díaz	Cuba	46.15	1001	PB
2	2	Daniel Almgren	Sweden	47.68	925	PB
3	2	Ashton Eaton	United States	47.75	921	
4	2	Oleksiy Kasyanov	Ukraine	47.85	916	SB
5	2	Leonel Suárez	Cuba	48.00	909	
6	4	Trey Hardee	United States	48.13	903	SB
7	3	Norman Müller	Germany	48.20	899	SB
8	4	Yordanis García	Cuba	48.34	893	PB
9	2	Larbi Bouraada	Algeria	48.58	881	
10	4	Willem Coertzen	South Africa	48.63	879	PB
11	3	Pascal Behrenbruch	Germany	48.72	875	SB
12	4	Nicklas Wiberg	Sweden	48.73	874	
13	4	Andrei Krauchanka	Belarus	48.77	872	SB
14	3	Andres Raja	Estonia	49.00	861	
15	3	Jake Arnold	United States	49.07	858	SB
16	4	Moritz Cleve	Germany	49.17	853	
17	1	Daisuke Ikeda	Japan	49.28	848	PB
18	1	Aleksey Sysoyev	Russia	49.32	846	SB
19	3	Vasiliy Kharlamov	Russia	49.44	841	
20	5	Dmitriy Karpov	Kazakhstan	49.45	840	SB
21	3	Yevhen Nikitin	Ukraine	49.50	838	
22	3	Mateo Sossah	France	49.60	833	
23	4	Romain Barras	France	49.66	830	
24	2	Simon Walter	Switzerland	49.67	830	
25	1	Attila Szabó	Hungary	49.79	824	PB
26	1	Atis Vaisjuns	Latvia	49.88	820	PB
27	1	Ingmar Vos	Netherlands	49.99	815	SB
28	1	Brent Newdick	New Zealand	50.10	810	
29	5	Eugène Martineau	Netherlands	50.26	803	
30	5	Aleksandr Pogorelov	Russia	50.27	802	SB
31	1	Roman Šebrle	Czech Republic	50.42	795	
32	5	Mikk-Mihkel Arro	Estonia	51.28	757	
33	5	Nadir El Fassi	France	51.35	753	
34	5	Agustín Félix	Spain	52.41	707	
	2	Eelco Sintnicolaas	Netherlands	DNS	0	

=== 110 metres hurdles ===
Rank	Heat	Athlete	Nationality	Time	Points	Notes
1	2	Trey Hardee	United States	13.86	993	SB
2	2	Yordanis García	Cuba	14.08	964	
3	3	Andrei Krauchanka	Belarus	14.13	958	SB
4	1	Aleksandr Pogorelov	Russia	14.19	950	SB
5	2	Andres Raja	Estonia	14.22	946	
6	2	Pascal Behrenbruch	Germany	14.24	944	
7	3	Willem Coertzen	South Africa	14.26	941	PB
8	3	Romain Barras	France	14.27	940	SB
9	2	Ashton Eaton	United States	14.28	939	
10	2	Jake Arnold	United States	14.40	924	
11	3	Oleksiy Kasyanov	Ukraine	14.44	918	
11	3	Roman Šebrle	Czech Republic	14.44	918	
13	2	Leonel Suárez	Cuba	14.45	917	
14	4	Dmitriy Karpov	Kazakhstan	14.46	916	SB
15	5	Ingmar Vos	Netherlands	14.51	910	PB
16	3	Moritz Cleve	Germany	14.54	906	
17	1	Yunior Díaz	Cuba	14.56	903	
18	5	Larbi Bouraada	Algeria	14.57	902	PB
19	1	Norman Müller	Germany	14.59	900	
20	4	Attila Szabó	Hungary	14.65	892	SB
21	5	Nicklas Wiberg	Sweden	14.75	880	
22	5	Agustín Félix	Spain	14.80	874	
23	3	Brent Newdick	New Zealand	14.82	871	
23	5	Mikk-Mihkel Arro	Estonia	14.82	871	
25	4	Simon Walter	Switzerland	14.83	870	
25	4	Mateo Sossah	France	14.83	870	
25	5	Vasiliy Kharlamov	Russia	14.83	870	
28	1	Yevhen Nikitin	Ukraine	14.87	865	
29	1	Daisuke Ikeda	Japan	14.90	862	
29	4	Nadir El Fassi	France	14.90	862	SB
31	1	Eugène Martineau	Netherlands	14.91	860	
32	4	Alexey Sysoev	Russia	14.97	853	SB
33	4	Daniel Almgren	Sweden	15.14	833	
34	4	Atis Vaisjuns	Latvia	15.27	817	

=== Discus throw ===
Rank	Group	Athlete	Nationality	Result	Points	Notes
1	B	Alexey Sysoev	Russia	53.03	934	SB
2	B	Dmitriy Karpov	Kazakhstan	48.93	848	
3	B	Aleksandr Pogorelov	Russia	48.46	838	
4	B	Trey Hardee	United States	48.08	830	SB
5	B	Pascal Behrenbruch	Germany	48.06	830	
6	B	Oleksiy Kasyanov	Ukraine	46.70	802	
7	B	Roman Šebrle	Czech Republic	46.30	794	
8	B	Vasiliy Kharlamov	Russia	46.24	792	
9	B	Romain Barras	France	45.62	780	PB
10	B	Eugène Martineau	Netherlands	44.94	766	SB
11	B	Leonel Suárez	Cuba	44.71	761	
12	B	Yordanis García	Cuba	44.40	754	SB
13	B	Attila Szabó	Hungary	43.75	741	
14	B	Brent Newdick	New Zealand	43.60	738	
15	A	Yunior Díaz	Cuba	43.52	736	
16	B	Jake Arnold	United States	43.23	730	
17	A	Agustín Félix	Spain	42.81	722	SB
18	A	Andres Raja	Estonia	42.75	721	PB
19	B	Yevhen Nikitin	Ukraine	42.71	720	
20	B	Simon Walter	Switzerland	42.48	715	
21	A	Willem Coertzen	South Africa	42.40	713	PB
22	A	Ingmar Vos	Netherlands	42.39	713	SB
23	A	Nicklas Wiberg	Sweden	42.28	711	SB
24	A	Nadir El Fassi	France	42.25	710	SB
25	A	Andrei Krauchanka	Belarus	42.24	710	
26	A	Atis Vaisjuns	Latvia	42.02	706	SB
27	A	Mikk-Mihkel Arro	Estonia	41.83	702	SB
28	B	Mateo Sossah	France	41.25	690	
29	A	Norman Müller	Germany	41.21	689	
30	A	Daisuke Ikeda	Japan	39.72	659	
31	A	Moritz Cleve	Germany	39.62	657	
32	A	Larbi Bouraada	Algeria	37.83	621	PB
33	A	Ashton Eaton	United States	37.15	607	
34	A	Daniel Almgren	Sweden	34.33	550	

=== Pole vault ===
Rank	Group	Athlete	Nationality	Result	Points	Notes
1	B	Trey Hardee	United States	5.20	972	SB
2	B	Alexey Sysoev	Russia	5.10	941	PB
3	B	Aleksandr Pogorelov	Russia	5.10	941	PB
4	B	Simon Walter	Switzerland	5.00	910	PB
5	B	Vasiliy Kharlamov	Russia	5.00	910	PB
5	B	Ashton Eaton	United States	5.00	910	SB
7	B	Romain Barras	France	5.00	910	SB
8	B	Leonel Suárez	Cuba	5.00	910	PB
9	B	Andrei Krauchanka	Belarus	4.90	880	
10	B	Agustín Félix	Spain	4.90	880	SB
11	B	Dmitriy Karpov	Kazakhstan	4.80	849	
12	A	Nadir El Fassi	France	4.80	849	SB
13	A	Andres Raja	Estonia	4.80	849	PB
13	B	Eugène Martineau	Netherlands	4.80	849	
15	B	Norman Müller	Germany	4.80	849	
16	A	Brent Newdick	New Zealand	4.80	849	PB
16	A	Oleksiy Kasyanov	Ukraine	4.80	849	PB
18	A	Pascal Behrenbruch	Germany	4.80	849	PB
19	A	Larbi Bouraada	Algeria	4.70	819	PB
19	B	Jake Arnold	United States	4.70	819	
21	B	Yordanis García	Cuba	4.70	819	
22	B	Roman Šebrle	Czech Republic	4.60	790	
22	B	Moritz Cleve	Germany	4.60	790	
24	A	Willem Coertzen	South Africa	4.60	790	PB
25	A	Daisuke Ikeda	Japan	4.60	790	PB
26	A	Yevhen Nikitin	Ukraine	4.60	790	
27	A	Yunior Díaz	Cuba	4.60	790	PB
28	A	Mikk-Mihkel Arro	Estonia	4.50	760	
29	A	Nicklas Wiberg	Sweden	4.50	760	PB
30	A	Mateo Sossah	France	4.40	731	
30	A	Atis Vaisjuns	Latvia	4.40	731	
30	A	Ingmar Vos	Netherlands	4.40	731	PB
33	A	Attila Szabó	Hungary	4.40	731	PB
34	A	Daniel Almgren	Sweden	4.30	702	SB

=== Javelin throw ===
Rank	Group	Athlete	Nationality	Result	Points	Notes
1	B	Leonel Suárez	Cuba	75.19	969	
2	A	Nicklas Wiberg	Sweden	75.02	966	PB
3	A	Eugène Martineau	Netherlands	70.14	892	SB
4	B	Pascal Behrenbruch	Germany	69.72	885	PB
5	A	Yordanis García	Cuba	69.37	880	PB
6	B	Trey Hardee	United States	68.00	859	PB
7	A	Roman Šebrle	Czech Republic	65.61	823	
8	B	Willem Coertzen	South Africa	65.46	820	PB
9	B	Alexey Sysoev	Russia	64.55	807	PB
10	A	Ingmar Vos	Netherlands	64.27	802	SB
11	B	Aleksandr Pogorelov	Russia	63.95	797	SB
12	B	Daisuke Ikeda	Japan	63.73	794	
13	B	Larbi Bouraada	Algeria	62.53	776	PB
14	B	Romain Barras	France	61.24	757	
15	A	Andrei Krauchanka	Belarus	60.71	749	
16	B	Yunior Díaz	Cuba	60.09	739	PB
17	B	Vasiliy Kharlamov	Russia	59.93	737	PB
18	A	Mateo Sossah	France	59.67	733	
19	A	Attila Szabó	Hungary	59.56	731	
20	B	Andres Raja	Estonia	57.73	704	
21	B	Nadir El Fassi	France	57.65	703	SB
22	A	Atis Vaisjuns	Latvia	57.50	700	
23	A	Norman Müller	Germany	57.40	699	
24	A	Jake Arnold	United States	57.37	698	
25	A	Daniel Almgren	Sweden	56.69	688	
26	A	Mikk-Mihkel Arro	Estonia	56.21	681	SB
27	B	Simon Walter	Switzerland	54.91	662	PB
28	B	Yevhen Nikitin	Ukraine	54.73	659	
29	A	Moritz Cleve	Germany	54.26	652	
30	B	Brent Newdick	New Zealand	51.52	611	
31	A	Dmitriy Karpov	Kazakhstan	51.38	609	
32	B	Ashton Eaton	United States	50.87	601	
33	A	Agustín Félix	Spain	50.10	590	
34	B	Oleksiy Kasyanov	Ukraine	49.00	574	

=== 1500 metres ===
Rank	Heat	Athlete	Nationality	Time	Points	Notes
1	1	Larbi Bouraada	Algeria	4:12.15	866	PB
2	1	Daniel Almgren	Sweden	4:13.47	857	
3	1	Nadir El Fassi	France	4:16.51	836	SB
4	2	Nicklas Wiberg	Sweden	4:17.05	832	SB
5	1	Mateo Sossah	France	4:20.40	809	SB
6	1	Daisuke Ikeda	Japan	4:22.39	795	PB
7	2	Oleksiy Kasyanov	Ukraine	4:24.52	781	SB
8	1	Moritz Cleve	Germany	4:25.96	771	PB
9	2	Romain Barras	France	4:27.04	764	
10	2	Leonel Suárez	Cuba	4:27.25	763	
11	1	Ingmar Vos	Netherlands	4:28.51	754	
12	1	Brent Newdick	New Zealand	4:30.57	741	PB
13	2	Willem Coertzen	South Africa	4:32.57	728	
14	2	Norman Müller	Germany	4:33.02	725	
15	2	Aleksey Sysoyev	Russia	4:34.97	712	SB
16	1	Eugène Martineau	Netherlands	4:35.27	710	SB
17	1	Jake Arnold	United States	4:35.93	706	
18	2	Andrei Krauchanka	Belarus	4:37.77	694	
19	2	Pascal Behrenbruch	Germany	4:39.45	684	
20	1	Yevhen Nikitin	Ukraine	4:40.12	680	
21	2	Yunior Díaz	Cuba	4:40.58	677	SB
22	2	Andres Raja	Estonia	4:40.73	676	PB
23	2	Vasiliy Kharlamov	Russia	4:41.54	671	
24	1	Mikk-Mihkel Arro	Estonia	4:44.14	654	
25	2	Ashton Eaton	United States	4:45.03	649	
26	1	Attila Szabó	Hungary	4:45.64	645	PB
27	2	Aleksandr Pogorelov	Russia	4:48.70	627	SB
28	2	Trey Hardee	United States	4:48.91	625	
29	2	Yordanis García	Cuba	4:49.45	622	
30	2	Roman Šebrle	Czech Republic	4:50.33	617	
31	1	Atis Vaisjuns	Latvia	4:52.08	606	
32	1	Dmitriy Karpov	Kazakhstan	4:53.61	597	
33	1	Agustín Félix	Spain	5:00.50	557	
34	1	Simon Walter	Switzerland	5:01.12	553	

=== Final standings ===
Rank	Athlete	Nationality	Points	Notes
1st place, gold medalist(s)	Trey Hardee	United States	8790	WL
2nd place, silver medalist(s)	Leonel Suárez	Cuba	8640	
DSQ (3rd)	Aleksandr Pogorelov	Russia	~~8528~~	~~PB~~
4	Oleksiy Kasyanov	Ukraine	8479	PB
5	Aleksey Sysoyev	Russia	8454	SB
6	Pascal Behrenbruch	Germany	8439	PB
7	Nicklas Wiberg	Sweden	8406	NR
8	Yordanis García	Cuba	8387	
9	Yunior Díaz	Cuba	8357	PB
10	Andrei Krauchanka	Belarus	8281	
11	Roman Šebrle	Czech Republic	8266	
12	Romain Barras	France	8204	
13	Larbi Bouraada	Algeria	8171	AR
14	Willem Coertzen	South Africa	8146	NR
15	Andres Raja	Estonia	8119	PB
16	Norman Müller	Germany	8096	
17	Vasiliy Kharlamov	Russia	8065	
18	Ashton Eaton	United States	8061	
19	Eugène Martineau	Netherlands	8055	
20	Ingmar Vos	Netherlands	8009	PB
21	Dmitriy Karpov	Kazakhstan	7952	
22	Nadir El Fassi	France	7922	SB
23	Brent Newdick	New Zealand	7915	PB
24	Jake Arnold	United States	7837	
25	Daniel Almgren	Sweden	7803	PB
26	Daisuke Ikeda	Japan	7788	PB
27	Moritz Cleve	Germany	7777	
28	Yevhen Nikitin	Ukraine	7710	
29	Mateo Sossah	France	7682	
30	Simon Walter	Switzerland	7649	
31	Attila Szabó	Hungary	7610	
32	Agustín Félix	Spain	7539	
33	Mikk-Mihkel Arro	Estonia	7528	
34	Atis Vaisjuns	Latvia	7507	
	Eelco Sintnicolaas	Netherlands	DNF	
	Mikk Pahapill	Estonia	DNF	
	Roland Schwarzl	Austria	DNF	
	Maurice Smith	Jamaica	DNF	

Key: PB = Personal best, SB = Seasonal best, WL = World leading (in a given season)

== See also ==
- 2009 Hypo-Meeting
- Athletics at the 2009 Summer Universiade – Men's decathlon
