= Sweden at the 2009 World Championships in Athletics =

- WA code: SWE
- National federation: Svenska Friidrottsförbundet
- Website: www.friidrott.se

in Berlin
- Competitors: 23

World Championships in Athletics appearances (overview)
- 1976; 1980; 1983; 1987; 1991; 1993; 1995; 1997; 1999; 2001; 2003; 2005; 2007; 2009; 2011; 2013; 2015; 2017; 2019; 2022; 2023; 2025

Sweden competed at the 2009 World Championships in Athletics from 15–23 August. A team of 23 athletes was announced in preparation for the competition. Selected athletes have achieved one of the competition's qualifying standards.

== Team selection ==
Track and road events

Event	Athletes	
Event	Men	Women
400 metres	Johan Wissman	
800 metres	Mattias Claesson	
3000 m steeplechase	Per Jacobsen; Mustafa Mohamed	Ulrika Johansson
110 metres hurdles	Robert Kronberg	—
20 km race walk	—	Monica Svensson
50 km race walk	Andreas Gustafsson	—

Field and combined events

Event	Athletes	
Event	Men	Women
High jump	Linus Thörnblad	Emma Green
Pole vault	Jesper Fritz; Alhaji Jeng	
Long jump	Michel Tornéus	
Shot put		Helena Engman
Discus throw		Sofia Larsson; Anna Söderberg
Hammer throw		Cecilia Nilsson
Javelin throw	Magnus Arvidsson; Jonas Lohse	
Heptathlon	—	Nadja Casadei; Jessica Samuelsson
Decathlon	Daniel Almgren; Nicklas Wiberg	—

== Results ==
=== Men ===
Track and road events

Event	Athletes	Heat Round 1		Heat Round 2		Semifinal		Final	
Event	Athletes	Result	Rank	Result	Rank	Result	Rank	Result	Rank
400 m	Johan Wissman	45.83	3 Q			DNS		Did not advance	
800 m	Mattias Claesson	1:48.02	26			Did not advance			
3000 m steeplechase	Per Jacobsen	8:44.80	11					Did not advance	
3000 m steeplechase	Mustafa Mohamed	8:22.92	6 q					8:35.77	14
110 m hurdles	Robert Kronberg	DNS							
50 km walk	Andreas Gustafsson							3:57:53 PB	21

Field events

Event	Athletes	Qualification		Final	
Event	Athletes	Result	Rank	Result	Rank
High jump	Linus Thörnblad	2.30	2 Q	2.23	5
Pole vault	Jesper Fritz	NM	-	Did not advance	
Pole vault	Alhaji Jeng	5.65 SB	11 q	5.50	12
Long jump	Michel Tornéus	7.78	28	Did not advance	
Javelin throw	Magnus Arvidsson	DNS			
Javelin throw	Jonas Lohse	75.33	30	Did not advance	
Decathlon	Daniel Almgren			7803	22
Decathlon	Nicklas Wiberg			8406	7

=== Women ===
Track and road events

Event	Athletes	Heat Round 1		Heat Round 2		Semifinal		Final	
Event	Athletes	Result	Rank	Result	Rank	Result	Rank	Result	Rank
3000 m steeplechase	Ulrika Johansson	9:38.88 PB	8	Did not advance					
20 km walk	Monica Svensson							DQ	

Field and combined events

Event	Athletes	Qualification		Final	
Event	Athletes	Result	Rank	Result	Rank
High jump	Emma Green	1.95	1 Q	1.96	7
Shot put	Helena Engman	17.19 SB	11	Did not advance	
Discus throw	Sofia Larsson	54.28	32	Did not advance	
Discus throw	Anna Söderberg	57.92	26	Did not advance	
Hammer throw	Cecilia Nilsson	63.77	34	Did not advance	
Heptathlon	Nadja Casadei			5598	22
Heptathlon	Jessica Samuelsson			5885	17

Key: Q = qualification by place, q = qualification by overall place, SB = Seasonal best, DQ = Disqualified, NM = no mark (i.e. no valid result), DNS = Did not start
