= France at the 2009 World Championships in Athletics =

- WA code: FRA
- National federation: Fédération Française d'Athlétisme
- Website: www.athle.com

in Berlin
- Competitors: 67
- Medals: Gold 0 Silver 1 Bronze 2 Total 3

World Championships in Athletics appearances
- 1976; 1980; 1983; 1987; 1991; 1993; 1995; 1997; 1999; 2001; 2003; 2005; 2007; 2009; 2011; 2013; 2015; 2017; 2019; 2022; 2023; 2025

France competed at the 2009 World Championships in Athletics from 15 to 23 August. A team of 67 athletes was announced in preparation for the competition. Selected athletes have achieved one of the competition's qualifying standards. Both of the country's medallists from the previous Championships, Romain Mesnil and Yohann Diniz competed, as well as the emerging talents of Mahiedine Mekhissi-Benabbad and Renaud Lavillenie.

== Team selection ==
Track and road events

Event	Athletes	
Event	Men	Women
100 metres	Christophe Lemaitre; Martial Mbandjock; Ronald Pognon	Myriam Soumare
200 metres	Martial Mbandjock	Johanna Danois
400 metres	Leslie Djhone; Yannick Fonsat; Teddy Venel	Solen Desert-Mariller
800 metres	Jeff Lastennet	Élodie Guégan
1500 metres	Medhi Baala; Mounir Yemouni; Yoann Kowal	Hind Dehiba Chahyd
5000 metres	Morhad Amdouni	
Marathon	James Kiboch Theuri	
100 metres hurdles	—	Cindy Billaud; Sandra Gomis
110 metres hurdles	Dimitri Bascou; Garfield Darien; Ladji Doucouré	—
400 metres hurdles	Heni Kechi	Aurore Kassambara
3000 m steeplechase	Mahiedine Mekhissi-Benabbad; Bouabdellah Tahri; Vincent Zouaoui-Dandrieux	Sophie Douarte; Elodie Olivares
50 km race walk	Herve Daveux; Yohann Diniz; Cédric Houssaye	—
4 × 100 metres relay	Eddy de Lepine; Christophe Lemaitre; Martial Mbandjock; Emmanuel Ngom Priso; Pierre-Alexis Pessonneaux; Ronald Pognon	
4 × 400 metres relay	David Alerte; Fadil Bellaabouss; Yoann Decimus; Leslie Djhone; Yannick Fonsat; Heni Kechi; Teddy Venel	Symphora Behi; Solen Desert-Mariller; Aurelie Kamga; Aurore Kassambara

Field and combined events

Event	Athletes	
Event	Men	Women
Pole vault	Damiel Dossevi; Renaud Lavillenie; Romain Mesnil	Telie Mathiot
High jump	Mickael Hanany	Melanie Melfort
Long jump	Kafetien Gomis; Salim Sdiri	Eloyse Lasueur
Triple jump	Teddy Tamgho	Vanessa Gladone; Teresa Nzola Meso Ba
Shot put	Yves Niare	Jessica Cérival; Laurence Manfredi
Discus throw	Bertrand Vili	Mélina Robert-Michon
Hammer throw	Jerome Bortoluzzi	Stephanie Falzon; Manuela Montebrun
Heptathlon	—	Marisa De Aniceto; Antoinette Nana Djimou Ida
Decathlon	Romain Barras; Nadir El Fassi; Mateo Sossah	—

== Results ==
=== Men ===
Track and road events

Event	Athletes	Heat Round 1		Heat Round 2		Semifinal		Final	
Event	Athletes	Result	Rank	Result	Rank	Result	Rank	Result	Rank
100 m	Christophe Lemaitre; Martial Mbandjock; Ronald Pognon	10.23; 10.28; 10.35	5 Q 12 Q 23 Q						
200 m	Martial Mbandjock	20.65	4 Q	20.55 PB	9 Q	20.43 PB	8		
400 m	Leslie Djhone; Yannick Fonsat; Teddy Venel								
800 m	Jeff Lastennet								
1500 m	Medhi Baala; Mounir Yemouni; Yoann Kowal								
5000 m	Morhad Amdouni								
110 m hurdles	Dimitri Bascou; Garfield Darien; Ladji Doucouré								
400 m hurdles	Heni Kechi								
3000 m steeplechase	Mahiedine Mekhissi-Benabbad; Bouabdellah Tahri; Vincent Zouaoui-Dandrieux								
4 × 100 m relay	Eddy de Lepine; Christophe Lemaitre; Martial Mbandjock; Emmanuel Ngom Priso; Pierre-Alexis Pessonneaux; Ronald Pognon								
4 × 400 m relay	David Alerte; Fadil Bellaabouss; Yoann Decimus; Leslie Djohne; Yannick Fonsat; Heni Kechi; Teddy Venel								
Marathon	James Kiboch Theuri								
50 km walk	Herve Daveux; Yohann Diniz; Cédric Houssaye								

Field events

Event	Athletes	Qualification		Final	
Event	Athletes	Result	Rank	Result	Rank
Long jump	Kafetien Gomis; Salim Sdiri				
Triple jump	Teddy Tamgho				
High jump	Mickael Hanany				
Pole vault	Damiel Dossevi; Renaud Lavillenie; Romain Mesnil				
Shot put	Yves Niare				
Discus throw	Bertrand Vili				
Hammer throw	Jerome Bortoluzzi				
Decathlon	Romain Barras; Nadir El Fassi; Mateo Sossah				

=== Women ===
Track and road events

Event	Athletes	Heat Round 1		Heat Round 2		Semifinal		Final	
Event	Athletes	Result	Rank	Result	Rank	Result	Rank	Result	Rank
100 m	Myriam Soumare								
200 m	Johanna Danois								
400 m	Solen Desert-Mariller								
800 m	Élodie Guégan								
1500 m	Hind Dehiba Chahyd								
100 m hurdles	Cindy Billaud; Sandra Gomis								
400 m hurdles	Aurore Kassambara								
3000 m steeplechase	Sophie Douarte; Elodie Olivares								
4 × 400 m relay	Symphora Behi; Solen Desert-Mariller; Aurelie Kamga; Aurore Kassambara								

Field and combined events

Event	Athletes	Qualification		Final	
Event	Athletes	Result	Rank	Result	Rank
Long jump	Eloyse Lasueur				
Triple jump	Vanessa Gladone; Teresa Nzola Meso Ba	13.51; 14.32	30; 6 q	Did not advance	Did not advance
High jump	Melanie Melfort				
Pole vault	Telie Mathiot				
Shot put	Jessica Cérival; Laurence Manfredi				
Discus throw	Mélina Robert-Michon				
Hammer throw	Stephanie Falzon; Manuela Montebrun				
Heptathlon	Marisa De Aniceto; Antoinette Nana Djimou Ida				
