= 2010 Hypo-Meeting =

The 36th edition of the annual Hypo-Meeting took place on May 29 and May 30, 2010 in Götzis, Austria. The track and field competition, featuring a men's decathlon and a women's heptathlon event was part of the 2010 IAAF World Combined Events Challenge. Oleksiy Kasyanov and Jessica Ennis led the men's and women's competition, respectively, after the first day. Ennis (6689 points) and Bryan Clay (8483 points) were the winners of the events overall.

== Men's Decathlon ==
=== Schedule ===
May 29
1. 100 m
2. Long Jump
3. Shot Put
4. High Jump
5. 400 m

May 30
6. 110 m hurdles
7. Discus Throw
8. Pole Vault
9. Javelin Throw
10. 1,500 m

=== Records ===
World Record	Roman Šebrle (CZE)	9026	May 27, 2001	Götzis, Austria
Event Record	Roman Šebrle (CZE)	9026	May 27, 2001	Götzis, Austria

=== Results ===
The best mark recorded in each event is highlighted in yellow

Rank	Athlete	Decathlon										Points
Rank	Athlete	1	2	3	4	5	6	7	8	9	10	Points
1	Bryan Clay (USA)	10.35	7.51	15.38	2.06	49.66	14.08	49.85	4.60	66.19	4:56.37	8483
2	Romain Barras (FRA)	11.02	7.13	16.19	2.00	48.59	14.39	42.53	5.00	61.48	4:31.07	8297
3	Leonel Suárez (CUB)	10.96	7.35	14.44	2.06	48.47	14.30	43.79	4.50	65.38	4:27.56	8286
4	Jake Arnold (USA)	11.04	6.96	15.17	2.00	49.29	14.12	46.51	5.10	62.28	4:40.74	8253
5	Eelco Sintnicolaas (NED)	10.79	7.40	13.07	1.97	48.10	14.40	39.70	5.00	60.30	4:28.41	8159
6	Andrei Krauchanka (BLR)	11.14	7.53	14.44	2.03	49.42	14.20	43.51	4.60	60.18	4:37.57	8112
7	Mikk Pahapill (EST)	11.05	7.47	15.18	2.00	50.65	14.35	43.63	4.50	62.60	4:34.95	8084
8	Pascal Behrenbruch (GER)	11.09	7.27	16.06	1.97	51.58	14.29	48.43	4.60	63.90	4:50.81	8069
9	Roland Schwarzl (AUT)	11.23	7.61	14.54	1.94	50.24	14.37	44.95	5.10	52.66	4:39.40	8032
10	Andres Raja (EST)	10.83	7.45	14.76	2.03	50.02	14.05	41.60	4.40	57.05	4:37.28	8029
11	Mihail Dudaš (SRB)	10.81	7.63	13.08	2.00	48.73	15.37	42.37	4.50	56.88	4:24.96	7966
12	Brent Newdick (NZL)	10.86	7.39	13.92	1.94	49.77	14.66	42.53	4.60	57.03	4:29.54	7935
13	Hans van Alphen (BEL)	11.12	7.24	15.04	1.94	50.18	15.09	45.30	4.40	61.80	4:26.51	7928
14	Dmitriy Karpov (KAZ)	10.97	7.06	16.23	2.03	51.00	14.94	49.30	4.80	50.21	4:56.45	7894
15	Ingmar Vos (NED)	10.75	7.23	14.12	2.00	50.67	14.68	41.06	4.30	62.74	4:36.72	7866
16	Dominik Distelberger (AUT)	10.63	7.50	11.62	1.88	47.25	14.46	31.43	4.40	54.39	4:36.16	7604
17	Simon Walter (SUI)	11.15	7.18	13.55	2.00	49.57	15.55	43.03	4.80	50.24	5:01.35	7526
18	Yordani García (CUB)	10.61	6.95	15.48	2.03	48.98	14.02	46.20	NM	63.32	4:42.68	7479
19	Nils Büker (GER)	10.81	7.38	13.60	2.00	49.46	15.14	39.35	4.00	50.40	4:48.80	7477
20	Nadir El Fassi (FRA)	11.33	7.21	12.21	1.91	50.93	15.33	34.93	4.40	50.00	4:21.29	7262
21	Petter Olson (SWE)	11.35	6.97	12.91	2.00	50.11	15.40	36.88	4.40	43.90	4:33.06	7224
—	Roman Šebrle (CZE)	11.08	7.65	14.88	2.03	50.38	—	—	—	—	—	DNF
—	Daniel Almgren (SWE)	11.07	7.26	13.10	1.94	49.44	—	—	—	—	—	DNF
—	Massimo Bertocchi (CAN)	10.79	7.37	15.54	2.00	48.60	14.74	47.53	—	—	—	DNF
—	Larbi Bouraada (ALG)	10.67	7.54	12.66	2.03	47.27	14.83	38.18	NM	—	—	DNF

== Women's heptathlon ==
=== Schedule ===
May 29
1. 100 m hurdles
2. High Jump
3. Shot Put
4. 200 m

May 30
5. Long Jump
6. Javelin Throw
7. 800 m

=== Records ===
World Record	Jackie Joyner-Kersee (USA)	7291	September 24, 1988	Seoul, South Korea
Event Record	Sabine Braun (GER)	6985	May 31, 1992	Götzis, Austria

=== Results ===
The best mark recorded in each event is highlighted in yellow

Rank	Athlete	Heptathlon							Points
Rank	Athlete	1	2	3	4	5	6	7	Points
1	Jessica Ennis (GBR)	12.89	1.91	14.25	23.31	6.13	43.40	2:11.19	6689
2	Tatyana Chernova (RUS)	13.47	1.82	13.66	24.47	6.52	51.35	2:13.97	6572
3	Lyudmyla Yosypenko (UKR)	13.77	1.85	12.99	24.64	6.20	48.69	2:20.69	6260
4	Jennifer Oeser (GER)	13.48	1.79	11.40	24.53	6.40	43.49	2:13.50	6193
5	Marina Goncharova (RUS)	14.10	1.82	13.11	25.65	5.97	50.68	2:12.95	6165
6	Yana Maksimava (BLR)	14.41	1.88	14.15	25.61	5.80	41.01	2:13.23	6031
7	Nataliya Dobrynska (UKR)	14.13	1.79	15.72	25.35	5.83	42.16	2:19.82	6023
8	Eliška Klucinová (CZE)	14.46	1.76	13.84	25.26	6.07	46.78	2:18.08	6007
9	Bettie Wade (USA)	14.00	1.82	13.62	25.07	6.29	37.62	2:21.17	6000
10	Antoinette Nana Djimou Ida (FRA)	13.65	1.73	13.45	24.76	6.07	44.26	2:22.54	5994
11	Claudia Rath (GER)	14.18	1.76	12.08	24.22	6.21	38.95	2:13.46	5984
12	Jessica Zelinka (CAN)	13.53	1.67	13.64	24.54	5.78	42.18	2:13.99	5962
13	Linda Züblin (SUI)	13.65	1.61	13.38	24.70	5.90	47.23	2:15.97	5948
14	Hanna Melnychenko (UKR)	13.87	1.76	13.19	24.86	6.02	37.84	2:19.42	5878
15	Marisa De Aniceto (FRA)	13.98	1.76	11.99	25.64	5.73	48.08	2:17.43	5848
16	Remona Fransen (NED)	14.14	1.82	12.87	24.98	5.97	33.78	2:16.38	5831
17	Louise Hazel (GBR)	13.49	1.55	12.35	24.31	5.99	44.13	2:17.28	5819
18	Francesca Doveri (ITA)	13.71	1.70	12.23	24.78	5.86	33.59	2:17.36	5670
19	Jana Korešová (CZE)	13.61	1.64	11.35	24.80	5.69	32.18	2:13.62	5526
20	Ida Marcussen (NOR)	15.02	1.67	12.86	26.02	5.85	40.73	2:16.65	5525
21	Nadezhda Sergeeva (RUS)	14.78	1.70	13.80	26.56	5.68	35.12	2:19.30	5416
—	Sara Aerts (BEL)	13.36	1.70	12.98	26.11	—	—	—	DNF
—	Phyllis Agbo (GBR)	13.89	1.70	12.60	25.00	NM	38.38	—	DNF
—	Hyleas Fountain (USA)	12.87	1.79	13.45	24.06	6.30	—	—	DNF
—	Maren Schwerdtner (GER)	13.89	1.70	13.59	25.07	5.84	—	—	DNF
—	Yvonne van Langen (NED)	13.48	1.76	13.15	24.38	5.69	—	—	DNF

== See also ==
- 2010 Decathlon Year Ranking
