= Czech Republic at the 2009 World Championships in Athletics =

- WA code: CZE
- National federation: Český atletický svaz
- Website: www.atletika.cz

in Berlin
- Competitors: 22
- Medals: Gold 0 Silver 1 Bronze 0 Total 1

World Championships in Athletics appearances
- 1993; 1995; 1997; 1999; 2001; 2003; 2005; 2007; 2009; 2011; 2013; 2015; 2017; 2019; 2022; 2023; 2025

The Czech Republic competed at the 2009 World Championships in Athletics from 15–23 August. A team of 22 athletes was announced in preparation for the competition. Selected athletes have achieved one of the competition's qualifying standards. Decathlete Roman Šebrle and javelin thrower Barbora Špotáková entered the competition as the reigning champions and world record holders at the time.

== Team selection ==
Track and road events

Event	Athletes	
Event	Men	Women
800 metres		Lenka Masná
100 metres hurdles	—	Lucie Škrobáková
110 metres hurdles	Petr Svoboda	—
400 metres hurdles		Zuzana Hejnová
20 km race walk		Zuzana Schindlerová

Field and combined events

Event	Athletes	
Event	Men	Women
Pole vault	Jan Kudlička	Jiřina Ptáčníková; Romana Maláčová
High jump	Jaroslav Bába	Iva Straková
Long jump	Roman Novotný; Štepán Wagner	
Triple jump		Martina Šestáková
Shot put	Antonín Žalský	
Discus throw		Věra Pospíšilová-Cechlová
Hammer throw	Lukáš Melich	Lenka Ledvinová
Javelin throw	Petr Frydrych; Vítězslav Veselý	Barbora Špotáková
Heptathlon	—	Eliška Klučinová
Decathlon	Roman Šebrle	—

== Results ==
=== Men ===
Track and road events

Event	Athletes	Heats		Semifinal		Final	
Event	Athletes	Result	Rank	Result	Rank	Result	Rank
110 m hurdles	Petr Svoboda	13.56	11	13.33 SB	4	13.38	6

Field events

Event	Athletes	Qualification		Final	
Event	Athletes	Result	Rank	Result	Rank
Long jump	Roman Novotný	7.86	26	did not advance	
Long jump	Štepán Wagner	7.68	35	did not advance	
High jump	Jaroslav Bába	2.27	12	2.23	5
Pole vault	Jan Kudlička	5.40	22	did not advance	
Shot put	Antonín Žalský	19.77	8	did not advance	
Javelin throw	Petr Frydrych	79.57	9	79.29	10
Javelin throw	Vítězslav Veselý	75.76	28	did not advance	
Hammer throw	Lukáš Melich	74.47	14	did not advance	
Decathlon	Roman Šebrle	-		8266	11

=== Women ===
Track and road events

Event	Athletes	Heats		Semifinal		Final	
Event	Athletes	Result	Rank	Result	Rank	Result	Rank
800 m	Lenka Masná	2:03.32	16	2:02.55	20	did not advance	
100 m hurdles	Lucie Škrobáková	13.04	18	12.92	12	did not advance	
400 m hurdles	Zuzana Hejnová	55.68	12	54.99	11	did not advance	
20 km walk	Zuzana Schindlerová	-				1:35:47	19

Field and combined events

Event	Athletes	Qualification		Final	
Event	Athletes	Result	Rank	Result	Rank
Triple jump	Martina Šestáková	13.84	22	did not advance	
High jump	Iva Straková	1.89	21	did not advance	
Pole vault	Jiřina Ptáčníková	4.40	16	did not advance	
Pole vault	Romana Maláčová	4.10	30	did not advance	
Discus throw	Věra Pospíšilová-Cechlová	59.52	18	did not advance	
Javelin throw	Barbora Špotáková	63.27	4	66.42	Silver medal
Hammer throw	Lenka Ledvinová	62.92	36	did not advance	
Heptathlon	Eliška Klučinová	-		5505	23
