= 2007 European Athletics U23 Championships – Men's javelin throw =

The men's javelin throw event at the 2007 European Athletics U23 Championships was held in Debrecen, Hungary, at Gyulai István Atlétikai Stadion on 12 and 14 July.

== Medalists ==
Gold	Alexander Vieweg; Germany
Silver	Kārlis Alainis; Latvia
Bronze	Oleksandr Pyatnytsya; Ukraine

== Results ==
=== Final ===
14 July

Rank	Name	Nationality	Attempts						Result	Notes
Rank	Name	Nationality	1	2	3	4	5	6	Result	Notes
1st place, gold medalist(s)	Alexander Vieweg	Germany	77.45	75.09	77.42	78.20	75.77	79.56	79.56	
2nd place, silver medalist(s)	Kārlis Alainis	Latvia	70.83	75.36	x	76.83	73.25	73.11	76.83	
3rd place, bronze medalist(s)	Oleksandr Pyatnytsya	Ukraine	72.58	74.81	71.61	76.28	x	75.65	76.28	
4	Ari Mannio	Finland	72.08	x	76.04	75.80	x	75.97	76.04	
5	Yervasios Filippidis	Greece	x	67.70	75.26	x	71.59	x	75.26	
6	Karol Jakimowicz	Poland	71.85	66.85	74.29	72.61	x	–	74.29	
7	Jonas Lohse	Sweden	72.43	69.07	73.26	70.45	–	x	73.26	
8	Melik Janoyan	Armenia	x	67.22	72.80	x	71.16	x	72.80	
9	Konstadinos Vertoudos	Greece	71.73	69.71	70.28				71.73	
10	Oleksandr Tertychnyy	Ukraine	71.46	70.44	70.81				71.46	
11	Valentinas Voveris	Lithuania	70.01	69.46	70.66				70.66	
12	Mikko Kankaanpää	Finland	65.44	65.05	69.01				69.01	

=== Qualifications ===
12 July
Qualifying 72.00 or 12 best to the Final

==== Group A ====
Rank	Name	Nationality	Result	Notes
1	Ari Mannio	Finland	75.14	Q
2	Kārlis Alainis	Latvia	74.65	Q
3	Konstadinos Vertoudos	Greece	72.41	Q
4	Oleksandr Tertychnyy	Ukraine	71.28	q
5	Valentinas Voveris	Lithuania	71.20	q
6	Melik Janoyan	Armenia	71.12	q
7	Ioannis Smalios	Greece	68.41	
8	Nicklas Wiberg	Sweden	66.90	
9	Niklas Wiklund	Sweden	59.82	

==== Group B ====
Rank	Name	Nationality	Result	Notes
1	Jonas Lohse	Sweden	77.09	Q
2	Oleksandr Pyatnytsya	Ukraine	74.50	Q
3	Mikko Kankaanpää	Finland	73.55	Q
4	Alexander Vieweg	Germany	72.95	Q
5	Karol Jakimowicz	Poland	72.08	Q
6	Yervasios Filippidis	Greece	71.81	q
7	Philippe Traulle	France	70.68	
8	Jan Syrovátko	Czech Republic	70.03	
9	Zoltán Magyari	Hungary	68.00	

== Participation ==
According to an unofficial count, 18 athletes from 12 countries participated in the event.

- Armenia (1)
- Czech Republic (1)
- Finland (2)
- France (1)
- Germany (1)
- Greece (3)
- Hungary (1)
- Latvia (1)
- Lithuania (1)
- Poland (1)
- Sweden (3)
- Ukraine (2)
