= Ukraine at the 2009 World Championships in Athletics =

- WA code: UKR

in Berlin
- Competitors: 54
- Medals: Gold 0 Silver 0 Bronze 0 Total 0

World Championships in Athletics appearances
- 1993; 1995; 1997; 1999; 2001; 2003; 2005; 2007; 2009; 2011; 2013; 2015; 2017; 2019; 2022; 2023; 2025

Ukraine competes at the 2009 World Championships in Athletics from 15–23 August in Berlin.

== Results ==
=== Men ===
==== Track and road events ====
Event	Athlete	Heats		Semifinals		Final	
Event	Athlete	Result	Place	Result	Place	Result	Place
200 metres	Ihor Bodrov	21.00	32	Did not advance			
110 metres hurdles	Serhiy Demydyuk	13.71	29	Did not advance			
400 metres hurdles	Stanislav Melnykov	50.41	23	Did not advance			
20 kilometres walk	Ruslan Dmytrenko					1:27:01	32
50 kilometres walk	Oleksiy Shelest					3:54:03	15

==== Field events ====
Event	Athlete	Qualification		Final	
Event	Athlete	Result	Place	Result	Place
High jump	Yuriy Krymarenko	2.24	18	Did not advance	
High jump	Viktor Shapoval	2.20	22	Did not advance	
High jump	Andriy Protsenko	2.20	25	Did not advance	
Pole vault	Maksym Mazuryk	5.65 Q	4	5.75	4
Pole vault	Denys Fedas	5.25	28	Did not advance	
Pole vault	Oleksandr Korchmid	XXX	NM	Did not advance	
Long jump	Viktor Kuznyetsov	7.98	17	Did not advance	
Long jump	Andriy Makarchev	7.87	23	Did not advance	
Long jump	Olexiy Lukashevych	7.87	24	Did not advance	
Triple jump	Mykola Savolaynen	16.72	19	Did not advance	
Triple jump	Yevhen Semenenko	16.54	26	Did not advance	
Triple jump	Viktor Yastrebov	16.31	31	Did not advance	
Discus throw	Ivan Hryshyn	59.93	21	Did not advance	
Discus throw	Oleksiy Semenov	58.78	26	Did not advance	
Hammer throw	Olexiy Sokyrskiyy	72.56	22	Did not advance	
Hammer throw	Artem Rubanko	69.81	29	Did not advance	
Javelin throw	Roman Avramenko	77.44	22	Did not advance	
Javelin throw	Oleksandr Pyatnytsya	76.13	27	Did not advance	

==== Decathlon ====
Athlete	Event	Results	Points	Rank
Oleksiy Kasyanov
Oleksiy Kasyanov	100 m	10.63	945	4
Oleksiy Kasyanov	Long jump	7.80	1010	3
Oleksiy Kasyanov	Shot put	15.72	834	4
Oleksiy Kasyanov	High jump	2.05	850	11
Oleksiy Kasyanov	400 m	47.85	916	4
Oleksiy Kasyanov	110 m hurdles	14.44	918	11
Oleksiy Kasyanov	Discus throw	46.70	802	6
Oleksiy Kasyanov	Pole vault	4.80	849	16
Oleksiy Kasyanov	Javelin throw	49.00	574	34
Oleksiy Kasyanov	1500 m	4:24.52	781	7
Total			8479	3rd place, bronze medalist(s)
Yevhen Nikitin
Yevhen Nikitin	100 m	11.04	852	19
Yevhen Nikitin	Long jump	6.92	795	32
Yevhen Nikitin	Shot put	14.69	771	14
Yevhen Nikitin	High jump	1.93	740	29
Yevhen Nikitin	400 m	49.50	838	21
Yevhen Nikitin	110 m hurdles	14.87	865	28
Yevhen Nikitin	Discus throw	42.71	720	19
Yevhen Nikitin	Pole vault	4.60	790	26
Yevhen Nikitin	Javelin throw	54.73	659	28
Yevhen Nikitin	1500 m	4:40.12	680	20
Total			7710	28
