= Daisuke Ikeda (disambiguation) =

Daisuke Ikeda (池田 大輔, born 1968) is a Japanese professional wrestler

Daisuke Ikeda may also refer to:

- Daisuke Ikeda (arranger) (池田 大介, born 1964), Japanese musical arranger
- Daisuke Ikeda (decathlete) (池田 大介, born 1986), Japanese decathlete
