= 2009 Hypo-Meeting =

The 35th edition of the annual Hypo-Meeting took place on 30 and 31 May 2009 in Götzis, Austria. The track and field competition, featuring a decathlon (men) and a heptathlon (women) event, was part of the 2009 IAAF World Combined Events Challenge.

== Men's decathlon ==
=== Schedule ===
May 30
1. 100 m
2. Long jump
3. Shot put
4. High jump
5. 400 m

May 31
6. 110 m hurdles
7. Discus throw
8. Pole vault
9. Javelin throw
10. 1,500 m

=== Records ===
World record	Roman Šebrle (CZE)	9026	27 May 2001	Götzis, Austria
Event record	Roman Šebrle (CZE)	9026	27 May 2001	Götzis, Austria

=== Results ===
The highest mark recorded in each event is highlighted in yellow

Rank	Athlete	Decathlon										Points
Rank	Athlete	1	2	3	4	5	6	7	8	9	10	Points
1	Michael Schrader (GER)	10.64	8.05	14.33	1.94	49.71	14.21	43.09	5.00	64.04	4:22.26	8522
2	Trey Hardee (USA)	10.48	7.74	13.93	2.00	48.42	14.11	45.11	5.10	63.98	4:43.79	8516
3	Pascal Behrenbruch (GER)	10.88	7.07	16.37	1.88	48.93	14.02	48.86	4.70	70.24	4:38.39	8374
4	Roman Šebrle (CZE)	11.14	7.86	15.41	1.94	49.50	14.33	46.71	4.90	67.54	4:48.88	8348
5	Oleksiy Kasyanov (UKR)	10.51	7.88	14.95	1.97	48.29	14.37	44.95	4.50	50.55	4:25.47	8286
6	Norman Müller (GER)	10.93	7.42	15.02	2.00	49.12	14.46	42.70	4.90	63.26	4:32.51	8272
7	Nicklas Wiberg (SWE)	11.07	7.52	14.13	2.12	48.71	14.65	41.90	4.20	65.67	4:20.16	8213
8	Andres Raja (EST)	10.81	7.48	14.15	2.00	48.88	14.18	42.13	4.60	61.44	4:46.74	8088
9	Eugène Martineau (NED)	11.15	7.40	13.87	2.00	50.18	14.55	43.80	4.80	65.86	4:37.63	8083
10	Robert Jacob Arnold (USA)	11.06	6.92	14.20	2.00	49.17	14.27	45.76	4.90	56.84	4:31.13	8069
11	Willem Coertzen (RSA)	11.08	7.58	13.31	2.03	48.88	14.39	42.35	4.20	65.05	4:29.42	8054
12	Eelco Sintnicolaas (NED)	10.89	7.76	13.64	1.91	48.45	14.55	35.46	5.20	54.20	4:29.20	8052
13	Ingmar Vos (NED)	10.89	7.53	13.95	2.06	50.12	14.66	40.03	4.30	60.97	4:25.72	8003
14	Jacob Minah (GER)	10.79	7.45	13.71	1.97	48.09	14.40	40.02	4.80	52.75	4:36.50	7991
15	Roland Schwarzl (AUT)	11.24	7.55	13.85	1.97	50.37	14.53	44.88	5.10	51.08	4:36.01	7971
16	Simon Walter (SUI)	11.04	7.06	13.13	1.94	47.98	14.82	41.74	4.90	50.88	4:39.39	7751
17	Vasiliy Kharlamov (RUS)	11.24	7.06	15.25	1.91	49.00	14.67	39.70	4.70	54.10	4:44.92	7691
18	Attila Szabó (HUN)	11.17	7.05	13.94	1.88	50.00	14.79	43.02	4.30	58.09	4:46.80	7535
—	Maurice Smith (JAM)	10.77	NM	16.24	1.94	48.56	14.01	48.64	4.60	49.74	—	6599
—	Arkadiy Vasilyev (RUS)	11.10	6.49	14.56	1.88	49.43	14.69	43.01	4.40	56.20	—	6858
—	Claston Bernard (JAM)	10.88	7.02	14.66	NM	—	—	—	—	—	—	DNF
—	Aleksey Drozdov (RUS)	11.20	7.15	14.67	—	—	—	—	—	—	—	DNF
—	William Frullani (ITA)	10.91	7.43	13.62	1.97	49.91	14.67	43.20	NM	—	—	DNF

== Women's heptathlon ==
=== Schedule ===
May 30
1. 100 m hurdles
2. High jump
3. Shot put
4. 200 m

May 31
5. Long jump
6. Javelin throw
7. 800 m

=== Records ===
World record	Jackie Joyner-Kersee (USA)	7291	24 September 1988	Seoul, South Korea
Event record	Sabine Braun (GER)	6985	31 May 1992	Götzis, Austria

=== Results ===
The highest mark recorded in each event is highlighted in yellow

Rank	Athlete	Heptathlon							Points
Rank	Athlete	1	2	3	4	5	6	7	Points
1	Nataliya Dobrynska (UKR)	13.87	1.79	15.13	24.66	6.73	47.03	2:12.96	6558
2	Hanna Melnychenko (UKR)	13.45	1.82	13.33	24.18	6.52	45.11	2:15.04	6445
3	Lyudmyla Yosypenko (UKR)	13.77	1.88	13.15	23.68	6.40	40.45	2:16.63	6361
4	Lilli Schwarzkopf (GER)	13.87	1.76	14.05	25.31	6.30	52.86	2:14.68	6337
5	Julia Mächtig (GER)	14.44	1.79	15.33	24.58	6.42	44.86	2:15.46	6320
6	Jennifer Oeser (GER)	13.53	1.76	13.52	24.35	6.37	44.56	2:13.27	6320
7	Tatyana Chernova (RUS)	13.69	1.82	12.42	23.95	6.30	44.63	2:18.54	6243
8	Yvonne Wisse (NED)	13.73	1.76	13.96	23.76	6.07	34.98	2:13.23	6100
9	Kaie Kand (EST)	14.16	1.76	13.29	25.18	5.96	40.74	2:10.35	5979
10	Linda Züblin (SUI)	13.96	1.67	13.01	24.71	5.89	47.72	2:15.85	5957
11	Phyllis Agbo (GBR)	13.91	1.73	13.48	24.57	6.47	39.79	2:27.51	5952
12	Yana Maksimava (BLR)	14.35	1.88	13.91	25.57	5.71	40.30	2:15.63	5951
13	Jessica Samuelsson (SWE)	14.26	1.70	13.77	24.26	5.98	32.90	2:09.52	5879
14	Ida Marcussen (NOR)	14.97	1.67	12.71	25.20	6.03	50.07	2:13.39	5877
15	Ellen Sprunger (SUI)	14.53	1.67	11.97	23.61	5.70	42.24	2:14.00	5776
16	Lisa Egarter (AUT)	14.84	1.67	11.41	26.06	5.73	39.22	2:21.78	5314
17	Marina Goncharova (RUS)	14.19	1.79	13.72	25.55	5.40	NM	2:14.28	5104
—	Olga Kurban (RUS)	13.78	1.79	13.93	24.42	5.77	33.43	—	5028
—	Györgyi Farkas (HUN)	14.45	1.76	—	—	—	—	—	DNF
—	Christine Schulz (GER)	13.57	1.73	14.20	24.63	—	—	—	DNF
—	Argiro Strataki (GRE)	14.36	1.70	—	—	—	—	—	DNF

== See also ==
- 2009 Decathlon Year Ranking
- 2009 World Championships in Athletics – Men's decathlon
- 2009 World Championships in Athletics – Women's heptathlon
- Athletics at the 2009 Summer Universiade – Men's decathlon
