= Hungary at the 2009 World Championships in Athletics =

- WA code: HUN

in Berlin
- Competitors: 12 (8 men, 4 women)
- Medals: Gold 0 Silver 0 Bronze 0 Total 0

World Championships in Athletics appearances
- 1976; 1980; 1983; 1987; 1991; 1993; 1995; 1997; 1999; 2001; 2003; 2005; 2007; 2009; 2011; 2013; 2015; 2017; 2019; 2022; 2023; 2025

Hungary competes at the 2009 World Championships in Athletics from 15–23 August in Berlin.

== Team selection ==
Track and road events

| Event | Athletes | |
| Event | Men | Women |
|---|---|---|
| 800 metres | Tamás Kazi | |
| 5000 metres | | Krisztina Papp |
| 110 metre hurdles | Dániel Kiss | |
| 3000 m steeplechase | Albert Minczér | Lívia Tóth |

Field and combined events

| Event | Athletes | |
| Event | Men | Women |
|---|---|---|
| Javelin throw | Csongor Olteán | |
| Shot Put | Lajos Kürthy | Anita Márton |
| Discus throw | Zoltán Kővágó | |
| Hammer throw | Krisztián Pars | Éva Orbán |
| Decathlon | Attila Szabó | |
