= 2006 Hypo-Meeting =

The 32nd edition of the annual Hypo-Meeting took place on May 27 and May 28, 2006 in Götzis, Austria. The track and field competition, featuring a decathlon (men) and a heptathlon (women) event was part of the 2006 IAAF World Combined Events Challenge.

== Men's Decathlon ==
=== Schedule ===
May 27
1. 100 m
2. Long Jump
3. Shot Put
4. High Jump
5. 400 m

May 28
6. 110 m hurdles
7. Discus Throw
8. Pole Vault
9. Javelin Throw
10. 1,500 m

=== Records ===
World Record	Roman Šebrle (CZE)	9026	May 27, 2001	Götzis, Austria
Event Record	Roman Šebrle (CZE)	9026	May 27, 2001	Götzis, Austria

=== Results ===
Rank	Athlete	Decathlon										Points
Rank	Athlete	1	2	3	4	5	6	7	8	9	10	Points
1	Bryan Clay (USA)	10,42	7.67	15.56	2.06	48,87	13,74	52.21	5.00	66.47	5.13,47	8677
2	Dmitriy Karpov (KAZ)	10,84	7.30	16.47	2.09	47,72	14,05	51.13	4.40	48.26	4.42,67	8293
3	Maurice Smith (JAM)	10,83	7.13	17.06	1.97	48,08	13,76	52.05	4.40	50.14	4.39,06	8269
4	André Niklaus (GER)	11,01	6.99	14.28	2.03	49,40	14,28	45.36	5.10	60.80	4.29,48	8239
5	Attila Zsivoczky (HUN)	11,01	6.96	15.56	2.09	49,72	14,54	47.77	4.70	59.34	4.32,90	8204
6	Aleksey Drozdov (RUS)	11,09	6.91	16.13	2.00	50,60	14,83	50.29	4.90	64.59	4.41,10	8188
7	Romain Barras (FRA)	11,20	7.10	14.29	1.94	48,78	14,16	43.51	5.00	61.75	4.28,91	8138
8	Aleksey Sysoyev (RUS)	10,88	6.51	14.87	2.06	48,97	14,86	53.40	4.70	57.18	4.38,00	8108
9	Norman Müller (GER)	11,09	7.21	14.41	1.91	48,37	14,46	43.28	4.90	60.69	4.29,97	8093
10	Pascal Behrenbruch (GER)	11,10	6.99	15.00	2.00	48,79	14,56	43.16	4.60	60.90	4.24,16	8069
11	Andrei Krauchanka (BLR)	11,14	7.34	12.83	2.12	48,95	14,28	40.69	4.60	54.86	4.24,44	8013
12	Mikk Pahapill (EST)	11,16	7.41	15.38	2.06	51,16	14,81	47.38	4.80	57.85	4.55,45	8002
13	Lars Albert (GER)	11,27	7.32	15.78	1.91	51,73	15,27	46.77	4.70	62.72	4.41,72	7878
14	Tomáš Dvořák (CZE)	11,12	6.79	15.69	1.94	50,83	14,68	42.44	4.70	65.44	4.40,85	7873
15	Ryan Harlan (USA)	11,04	6.73	16.19	2.06	50,19	13,99	41.72	4.80	53.81	5.21,20	7744
16	Roland Schwarzl (AUT)	11,27	7.28	13.33	1.91	50,12	14,68	40.86	4.80	51.98	4.36,10	7644
17	Madis Kallas (EST)	11,14	6.90	15.39	1.97	51,84	15,09	44.43	4.60	48.43	4.55,74	7476
18	Markus Walser (AUT)	10,98	6.80	14.32	1.88	49,84	15,17	37.25	4.70	54.96	5.03,06	7359
19	Johannes Künz (AUT)	11,49	6.65	13.36	1.85	49,65	15,69	40.70	4.30	48.11	4.19,62	7201
20	David Fröhlich (SUI)	11,21	6.57	13.31	1.91	50,30	15,09	37.78	4.20	48.55	4.38,66	7125
—	Roman Šebrle (CZE)	11.27	4.18	15.34	—	—	—	—	—	—	—	DNF
—	Anders Black (DEN)	11.26	7.12	13.78	—	—	—	—	—	—	—	DNF
—	Rudy Bourguignon (FRA)	11.24	6.94	13.71	—	—	—	—	—	—	—	DNF
—	David Gervasi (SUI)	11.50	6.82	13.29	—	—	—	—	—	—	—	DNF
—	François Gourmet (BEL)	10.79	7.12	14.19	1.88	—	—	—	—	—	—	DNF
—	Paul Terek (USA)	10.98	7.03	15.17	1.94	50.10	DNF	—	—	—	—	DNF

== Women's Heptathlon ==
=== Schedule ===
May 27
1. 100 m hurdles
2. High Jump
3. Shot Put
4. 200 m

May 28
5. Long Jump
6. Javelin Throw
7. 800 m

=== Records ===
World Record	Jackie Joyner-Kersee (USA)	7291	September 24, 1988	Seoul, South Korea
Event Record	Sabine Braun (GER)	6985	May 31, 1992	Götzis, Austria

=== Results ===
Rank	Athlete	Heptathlon							Points
Rank	Athlete	1	2	3	4	5	6	7	Points
1	Carolina Klüft (SWE)	13.63	1.88	15.05	24.26	6.50	50.96	2:14.34	6719
2	Lyudmila Blonska (UKR)	13.48	1.79	14.33	24.66	6.53	46.35	2:15.31	6448
3	Lilli Schwarzkopf (GER)	13.83	1.82	14.26	25.08	6.00	50.58	2:13.23	6335
4	Jessica Zelinka (CAN)	13.31	1.76	14.32	24.22	6.19	41.52	2:12.48	6314
5	Argiro Strataki (GRE)	13.93	1.76	13.81	24.60	6.34	45.16	2:15.09	6235
6	Karolina Tymińska (POL)	14.14	1.70	13.12	24.01	6.49	40.70	2:06.26	6234
7	Olga Levenkova (RUS)	13.80	1.79	14.10	24.33	6.09	42.63	2:13.60	6231
8	Tia Hellebaut (BEL)	14.15	1.97	12.14	25.30	6.14	43.18	2:14.75	6201
9	Claudia Tonn (GER)	14.11	1.76	12.89	25.05	6.50	40.96	2:10.05	6150
10	Sonja Kesselschläger (GER)	13.87	1.79	14.03	25.60	6.28	40.52	2:14.86	6101
11	Yuliya Ignatkina (RUS)	14.27	1.73	14.18	24.69	6.13	41.79	2:11.56	6087
12	Hyleas Fountain (USA)	13.37	1.76	12.37	24.27	6.34	37.60	2:21.41	6019
13	Hanna Melnychenko (UKR)	13.57	1.76	13.14	24.65	6.00	41.11	2:19.70	5991
14	Marie Collonvillé (FRA)	14.01	1.79	12.25	25.14	6.35	42.33	2:20.44	5984
15	Irina Naumenko (KAZ)	14.40	1.79	13.45	25.17	5.92	40.75	2:15.41	5911
16	Simone Oberer (SUI)	14.04	1.82	12.14	25.64	6.19	38.07	2:14.95	5906
17	Julia Mächtig (GER)	15.19	1.73	13.75	24.57	6.06	41.71	2:15.75	5862
18	Yvonne Wisse (NED)	13.74	1.76	12.78	24.76	5.86	33.25	2:13.62	5822
19	Antoinette Nana Djimou Ida (FRA)	13.79	1.61	12.97	25.24	5.85	44.89	2:22.51	5700
20	Sylvie Dufour (SUI)	14.53	1.70	12.73	25.96	5.56	43.39	2:15.54	5604
21	Katja Keller (GER)	13.66	1.76	12.87	25.42	NM	39.96	2:17.21	5052
22	GiGi Johnson (USA)	13.12	1.70	13.96	24.18	5.67	35.28	DNF	5042

== See also ==
- 2006 European Athletics Championships – Men's Decathlon
- 2006 Decathlon Year Ranking
- 2006 European Athletics Championships – Women's heptathlon
