= 2004 World Junior Championships in Athletics – Men's decathlon =

The men's decathlon event at the 2004 World Junior Championships in Athletics was held in Grosseto, Italy, at Stadio Olimpico Carlo Zecchini on 14 and 15 July. Junior implements (valid until 2005) were used, i.e. 106.7 cm (3'6) (senior implement) hurdles, as well as 6 kg shot and 1.75 kg discus.

== Medalists ==
Gold	Andrei Krauchanka; Belarus
Silver	Aleksey Sysoyev; Russia
Bronze	Norman Müller; Germany

== Results ==
=== Final ===
14/15 July

The highest mark recorded in each event is highlighted in yellow

Rank	Name	Nationality	100m	LJ	SP	HJ	400m	110m H	DT	PV	JT	1500m	Points	Notes
1st place, gold medalist(s)	Andrei Krauchanka	Belarus	11.09 (w: -0.5 m/s)	7.46	14.51	2.16	48.98	14.55 (w: 0.4 m/s)	43.41	4.50	52.84	4:28.46	8126	
2nd place, silver medalist(s)	Aleksey Sysoyev	Russia	10.86 (w: -0.2 m/s)	6.84	16.94	1.95	49.72	15.25 (w: 0.3 m/s)	53.80	4.30	57.44	4:34.84	8047	
3rd place, bronze medalist(s)	Norman Müller	Germany	11.11 (w: -0.2 m/s)	7.24	15.59	2.01	49.16	15.16 (w: 0.4 m/s)	43.42	4.70	53.77	4:34.70	7942	
4	Pelle Rietveld	Netherlands	10.97 (w: -0.5 m/s)	7.09	14.03	1.92	48.52	14.95 (w: 0.3 m/s)	36.63	4.70	60.95	4:28.82	7822	
5	Andrés Silva	Uruguay	10.75 (w: -0.5 m/s)	7.23	13.23	1.86	46.79	15.57 (w: 0.4 m/s)	35.28	4.30	47.60	4:18.68	7542	
6	Sami Itani	Finland	11.32 (w: -0.5 m/s)	6.66	14.31	2.01	51.85	15.32 (w: 0.4 m/s)	45.09	4.10	58.20	4:44.44	7405	
7	Arthur Abele	Germany	11.25 (w: -0.5 m/s)	6.82	13.07	1.89	49.91	14.84 (w: -0.2 m/s)	35.82	3.80	56.26	4:28.01	7224	
8	Chris Helwick	United States	11.61 (w: -0.5 m/s)	6.53	12.17	1.95	50.99	15.34 (w: -0.2 m/s)	42.72	4.40	55.45	4:42.13	7176	
9	Bob Altena	Netherlands	11.49 (w: -0.2 m/s)	6.89	13.55	1.86	51.44	15.20 (w: 0.4 m/s)	40.38	4.40	48.12	4:34.68	7175	
10	Daisuke Ikeda	Japan	11.56 (w: -0.5 m/s)	6.49	13.81	1.89	50.76	15.24 (w: 0.3 m/s)	36.75	4.10	56.34	4:27.51	7146	
11	Jangy Addy	United States	11.21 (w: -0.5 m/s)	6.35	15.25	1.89	48.47	15.58 (w: 0.3 m/s)	45.04	3.70	50.84	4:58.28	7129	
12	Tarmo Riitmuru	Estonia	11.61 (w: -0.5 m/s)	6.62	13.53	1.98	51.72	15.82 (w: 0.4 m/s)	38.08	4.10	49.56	4:29.64	7030	
13	Andrey Klimarchuk	Ukraine	11.68 (w: -0.5 m/s)	6.84	12.17	1.98	51.01	15.72 (w: 0.3 m/s)	38.36	3.90	49.49	4:41.23	6902	
14	Simon Walter	Switzerland	11.37 (w: -0.2 m/s)	6.76	13.81	1.86	51.58	15.59 (w: -0.2 m/s)	36.07	4.20	44.03	4:51.92	6822	
15	Olivier Lichtenthaler	Switzerland	11.31 (w: -0.5 m/s)	6.61	12.97	1.86	52.75	16.01 (w: 0.3 m/s)	32.90	4.10	53.16	4:43.68	6743	
16	Brent Newdick	New Zealand	11.32 (w: -0.2 m/s)	6.86	13.43	1.80	50.97	15.04 (w: -0.2 m/s)	37.97	DNF	50.62	4:52.60	6331	
	Yevgeniy Nikitin	Ukraine	11.37 (w: -0.5 m/s)	6.81	14.59	1.83	50.61	15.17 (w: -0.2 m/s)	44.30	DNF	DNS	DNS	DNF	
	Lukáš Patera	Czech Republic	11.05 (w: -0.5 m/s)	6.89	14.26	1.83	49.45	15.02 (w: 0.4 m/s)	36.41	DNS	DNS	DNS	DNF	
	Franco Luigi Casiean	Italy	10.96 (w: -0.2 m/s)	7.20	13.72	1.86	51.51	15.79 (w: -0.2 m/s)	36.57	DNS	DNS	DNS	DNF	
	Janis Skrastins	Latvia	11.19 (w: -0.2 m/s)	7.13	12.97	1.98	51.01	16.75 (w: -0.2 m/s)	DNS	DNS	DNS	DNS	DNF	
	Nicklas Wiberg	Sweden	11.32 (w: -0.5 m/s)	6.75	14.42	1.95	DNF	DNS	DNS	DNS	DNS	DNS	DNF	
	Joni Ojala	Finland	11.57 (w: -0.5 m/s)	4.73	DNS	DNS	DNS	DNS	DNS	DNS	DNS	DNS	DNF	
	Mikalai Shubianok	Belarus	11.39 (w: -0.5 m/s)	NM	DNS	DNS	DNS	DNS	DNS	DNS	DNS	DNS	DNF	
	Krister Altosaar	Estonia	DNF	DNS	DNS	DNS	DNS	DNS	DNS	DNS	DNS	DNS	DNF	

== Participation ==
According to an unofficial count, 24 athletes from 16 countries participated in the event.

- Belarus (2)
- Czech Republic (1)
- Estonia (2)
- Finland (2)
- Germany (2)
- Italy (1)
- Japan (1)
- Latvia (1)
- Netherlands (2)
- New Zealand (1)
- Russia (1)
- Sweden (1)
- Switzerland (2)
- Ukraine (2)
- United States (2)
- Uruguay (1)
