= Nicklas Wiberg =

Swedish decathlete (born 1985)

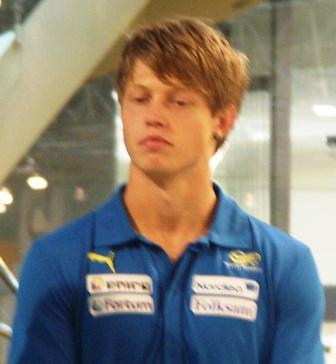
Nicklas Wiberg in 2009

Nicklas Robert Wiberg (born 16 April 1985) is a Swedish decathlete. His lifetime best and Swedish record of 8406 points was set at the 2009 World Championships, where he finished sixth. He won the 2003 European Junior Championships and three Swedish indoor titles (two in the heptathlon, one in a single event), but no Swedish championships outdoors.

== Career ==
He hails from Öland and represented the club FI Kalmarsund. He made his breakthrough in 2003, when he won the decathlon at the European Junior Championships. His three strongest events were the jumps and javelin throw, and he also became Swedish junior champion in the individual javelin. Ahead of the 1500 metres, he was third and had to beat his two competitors by 18 and 15 seconds respectively; Wiberg profited from past experience in middle-distance running and beat them with 30 and 33 seconds respectively. His result of 7604 points was a Swedish U20 record. At the 2004 World Junior Championships, he started the decathlon well, before not finishing the 400 metres, hence not the decathlon either.

He took his first Swedish championship title in 2005, the indoor heptathlon. In the following season, he failed to finish the Multistars decathlon meet and also achieved a lowly 6970 points at the European Cup Combined Events, but won a tri-nation match in Rakvere with 7883 points to qualify for the 2006 European Championships on home soil in Gothenburg. Here, he recorded a modest 6929 points to finish 20th.

As he became Swedish indoor champion again and finished 12th at his first Hypo-Meeting in 2007, he chose to compete in the individual javelin throw at the 2007 European U23 Championships where he was eliminated in the qualification. At the 2008 Hypo-Meeting in Götzis, he came close to the 8000-point barrier as he scored 7917 points, followed by 8040 points at the June 2008 European Cup Combined Events. He won that event, and also competed at his first Finland–Sweden Athletics International.

He did not reach the 2008 Olympic Games, but aimed for the 2009 World Championships. After winning his first single-event Swedish indoor title in the long jump, he scored 8213 points to finish 7th at the 2009 Hypo-Meeting and then 8406 points to finish 6th at the 2009 World Championships. Among others, he scored over 1000 points in the javelin throw, with a length of 75.02 metres. He set a new Swedish record, only 3 points ahead of Henrik Dagård's previous record. Aftonbladet now regarded Wiberg as a medal candidate at the 2012 Olympic Games.

Wiberg also started 2010 well, with a personal best in the pole vault of 4.52 metres in January. A few days later he beat Trey Hardee in a triathlon—60 metres hurdles, long jump and shot put—in Scandinavium, Gothenburg. Following "minor problems, among others with a knee", Wiberg had to sit out the 2010 Hypo-Meeting. He had a good start to the decathlon at the 2010 European Championships, but suffered from dehydration and was not able to finish. He had two knee surgeries. He also missed the 2011 World Championships, now because of heel surgery. Subsequently, he was hoping for a comeback in 2012, but missed the 2012 European Championships and Olympic Games.

Having registered no results in 2011 and barely any in 2012, Wiberg made his comeback in January 2013. He did not finish at the Swedish indoor combined events championships, but entered the 2013 European Cup Combined Events First League where he recorded 7678 points and a second place.

== Awards and later career ==
He won the Swedish Breakthrough of the Year in 2008. In 2009 he received a Swedish Olympic Committee grant to aim for the 2012 Olympics.

He was indicted into the Swedish version of the hall of fame, receiving a Stora grabbars märke. In 2024 he received Kalmar Municipality's sports award for his work as a sports consultant. He was also an athletics coach in and around Kalmar and received national team jobs from 2024.

In 2023 he took up floorball.
