= 2006 European Athletics Championships – Men's decathlon =

Men's decathlon at the European Athletics Championships

These are the official results of the men's decathlon competition at the 2006 European Athletics Championships in Gothenburg, Sweden. The competition started on 10 August and ended a day later, on 11 August, in the main stadium during the 19th edition of the championships, the Stadium Ullevi.

== Medalists ==
Gold	Roman Šebrle; Czech Republic (CZE)
Silver	Attila Zsivoczky; Hungary (HUN)
Bronze	Aleksey Drozdov; Russia (RUS)

== Schedule ==
10 August
1. 100 m
2. Long jump
3. Shot put
4. High jump
5. 400 m

11 August
6. 110 m hurdles
7. Discus throw
8. Pole vault
9. Javelin throw
10. 1,500 m

== Records ==
World record	Roman Šebrle (CZE)	9026	27 May 2001	Götzis, Austria
European record	Roman Šebrle (CZE)	9026	27 May 2001	Götzis, Austria

== Results ==
The highest mark recorded in each event is highlighted in gold.

Rank	Name	100m	LJ	SP	HJ	400m	110m H	DT	PV	JT	1500m	Points
1st place, gold medalist(s)	Roman Šebrle (CZE)	10.98	7.72	15.53	2.09	49.11	14.27	45.47	5.00	66.90	4:46.91	8526
2nd place, silver medalist(s)	Attila Zsivoczky (HUN)	11.17	7.06	15.74	2.09	50.06	14.66	46.87	4.90	66.79	4:28.52	8356
3rd place, bronze medalist(s)	Aleksey Drozdov (RUS)	11.05	7.26	16.61	2.03	50.27	14.74	48.06	5.00	61.22	4:32.93	8350
4	Aleksandr Pogorelov (RUS)	11.00	7.54	14.84	2.09	50.84	14.44	47.39	5.10	61.38	4:59.61	8245
5	Pascal Behrenbruch (GER)	10.90	6.92	16.15	2.00	48.48	14.25	45.19	4.60	66.47	4:46.23	8209
6	Aliaksandr Parkhomenka (BLR)	11.33	7.13	15.93	2.00	50.33	14.58	43.99	4.70	66.02	4:27.99	8136
7	Stefan Drews (GER)	10.91	7.51	13.99	1.94	48.46	14.20	41.09	5.30	48.93	4:35.38	8105
8	Romain Barras (FRA)	11.22	7.19	14.36	1.94	49.26	14.29	41.64	4.90	63.17	4:25.66	8093
9	Kristjan Rahnu (EST)	10.84	7.40	15.26	2.00	49.67	14.48	43.46	4.80	59.20	4:50.80	8083
10	Aleksey Sysoyev (RUS)	10.93	6.83	16.08	2.09	48.89	15.24	50.67	4.50	50.68	4:29.94	8068
11	Eugène Martineau (NED)	11.09	7.00	13.48	2.06	49.66	14.92	41.74	4.80	64.48	4:24.59	8035
12	Tomáš Dvořák (CZE)	11.25	7.26	15.85	1.97	51.20	14.61	42.91	4.80	64.16	4:42.29	7997
13	François Gourmet (BEL)	10.75	7.01	13.62	1.94	48.05	15.18	39.37	4.90	58.30	4:28.44	7921
14	Josef Karas (CZE)	11.00	7.19	13.80	2.00	50.21	15.42	44.32	4.50	49.54	4:32.02	7669
15	Rudy Bourguignon (FRA)	11.24	7.18	13.68	1.85	51.35	15.55	43.16	5.10	59.09	4:46.24	7617
16	Nadir El Fassi (FRA)	11.07	7.22	13.58	1.97	50.53	15.10	38.41	4.20	56.69	4:22.58	7604
17	Madis Kallas (EST)	11.21	7.22	14.62	2.00	51.70	14.72	42.09	4.70	51.32	5:10.98	7503
18	Óscar González (ESP)	11.34	7.16	13.14	2.00	50.19	15.45	40.50	4.60	48.99	4:31.82	7491
19	Lassi Raunio (FIN)	11.00	7.05	13.69	1.91	50.32	14.64	45.02	4.20	56.45	5:06.34	7462
20	Nicklas Wiberg (SWE)	11.12	7.11	13.35	2.03	49.70	15.19	—	3.30	66.19	4:19.10	6929
—	William Frullani (ITA)	10.91	7.32	14.23	2.03	50.91	14.64	42.49	—	—	—	DNF
—	Dennis Leyckes (GER)	11.02	6.98	12.89	1.91	48.03	14.57	42.30	NM	—	—	DNF
—	Agustín Félix (ESP)	11.32	7.09	12.00	2.00	DSQ	15.09	40.39	4.90	—	—	DNF
—	Hans Olav Uldal (NOR)	11.38	6.94	12.84	1.85	52.41	15.42	44.72	NM	—	—	DNF
—	Darius Draudvila (LTU)	10.98	7.02	14.51	1.97	49.87	DNF	NM	—	—	—	DNF
—	Jaakko Ojaniemi (FIN)	11.07	7.05	14.74	1.91	DSQ	—	—	—	—	—	DNF
—	Mikk Pahapill (EST)	—	6.80	13.98	1.88	—	—	—	—	—	—	DNF

== See also ==
- 2005 World Championships in Athletics – Men's decathlon
- 2006 Hypo-Meeting
- 2006 Decathlon Year Ranking
- 2007 World Championships in Athletics – Men's decathlon
