= Attila Szabó (athlete) =

Hungarian decathlete

Attila Szabó (born July 16, 1984 in Budapest) is a male decathlete from Hungary. He twice won the men's national title in the decathlon: 2007 and 2009.

He received a one-year doping ban due to failing the whereabouts rule on three occasions, beginning January 2014.

== Achievements ==
Year	Competition	Venue	Position	Event	Notes
Representing Hungary
2005	European U23 Championships	Erfurt, Germany	11th	Decathlon	7369 pts
2009	Hypo-Meeting	Götzis, Austria	18th	Decathlon	7535 pts
2009	Universiade	Belgrade, Serbia	3rd	Decathlon	7748 pts
2009	World Championships	Berlin, Germany	31st	Decathlon	7610 pts
2012	Summer Olympics	London, England	24th	Decathlon	7581 pts
