= Alexander Vieweg =

German javelin thrower

Personal information
- Nationality: German
- Born: June 28, 1986 (age 40)
- Height: 1.92 m (6 ft 3 1/2 in)
- Weight: 95 kg (209 lb)

Sport
- Country: Germany
- Sport: Track and field
- Event: Javelin throw
- Club: LAZ Zweibrücken
- Coached by: Boris Henry

Achievements and titles
- Personal best: Javelin throw: 83.27 m

Alexander Vieweg (born 26 June 1986) is a German track and field athlete competing in the javelin throw. He competed in the 2008 Summer Olympics in Beijing, where he missed the final round after finishing 17th in his qualification group with 67.49 m. Vieweg has a personal best of 83.27 m.

== Seasonal bests by year ==
- 2004 - 70.51
- 2005 - 75.85
- 2006 - 78.18
- 2007 - 79.56
- 2008 - 83.27
- 2009 - 79.00
- 2011 - 75.81
