= Daisuke Ikeda (decathlete) =

Japanese decathlete (born 1986)

Personal information
- Nationality: Japanese
- Born: 15 April 1986 (age 40) Tottori Prefecture, Japan
- Education: Nihon University
- Height: 1.85 m (6 ft 1 in)
- Weight: 80 kg (180 lb)

Sport
- Country: Japan
- Sport: Men's athletics
- Event: Decathlon

Achievements and titles
- Personal best(s): Decathlon: 7788 (Berlin 2009); Octathlon: 5766 (Sherbrooke 2003)
Medal record
East Asian Games
Silver medal – second place	2009 Hong Kong	Decathlon

Daisuke Ikeda (池田 大介, Ikeda Daisuke; born 15 April 1986 in Tottori Prefecture) is a Japanese decathlete. He competed at the 2009 World Championships.

== International competition ==
Representing Japan
Year	Competition	Venue	Position	Event	Result	Notes
2003	World Youth Championships	Sherbrooke, Canada	14th	Octathlon	5766 pts	PB
2004	World Junior Championships	Grosseto, Italy	10th	Decathlon	7146 pts	NJR
2009	World Championships	Berlin, Germany	25th	Decathlon	7788 pts	PB
2009	East Asian Games	Hong Kong, China	2nd	Decathlon	7596 pts	

== National titles ==
- Japanese Championships
  - Decathlon: 2009
