= Pascal Behrenbruch =

German decathlete

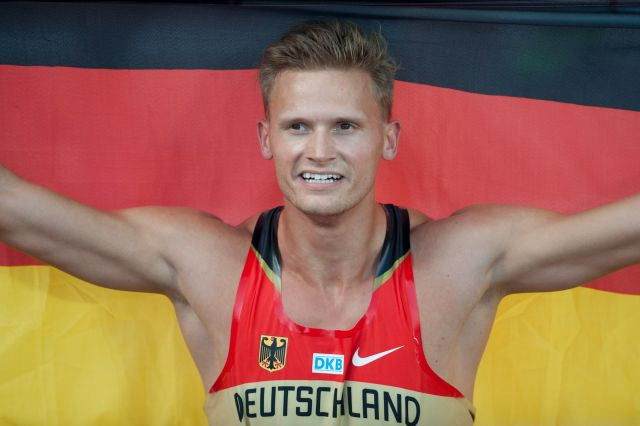
- Behrenbruch after winning at the 2012 European Championships.

Personal information
- Full name: Pascal Behrenbruch
- Nationality: German
- Born: 19 January 1985 (age 41) Offenbach am Main, West Germany
- Height: 1.96 m (6 ft 5 in)
- Weight: 210 lb (95 kg)
- Website: pascal-behrenbruch.de

Sport
- Country: Germany
- Sport: Athletics
- Event: Decathlon

Achievements and titles
- World finals: 6th at the 2009 World Championships in Athletics
- Personal best(s): 100 m: 10.84 400 m: 48.48; 1500 m: 4:24.16; 110 m hurdles: 14.02; High jump: 2.03; Long jump: 7.21; Shot put: 16.89; Discus: 51.31; Javelin: 71.40; Pole vault: 5.00 Decathlon: 8558

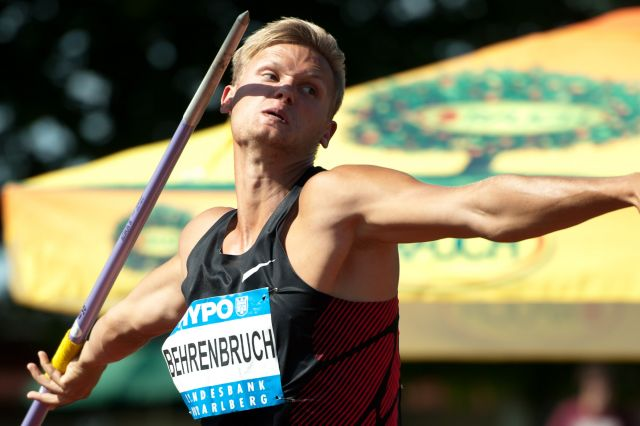
Behrenbruch competing at the 2011 Götzis Meeting.

Pascal Behrenbruch (born 19 January 1985 in Offenbach am Main) is a German decathlete. He is a member of the Eintracht Frankfurt athletics team and placed tenth at the 2012 Olympic Games.

He was the runner-up at the Décastar meeting in Talence in September 2010, collecting a season's best 8202 points.

Away from the track, Behrenbruch studied economics and computer science at university and now lives and trains in Tallinn, Estonia. His coach is Andrei Nazarov.

== Achievements ==
Year	Competition	Venue	Position	Event	Notes
Representing Germany
2006	Hypo-Meeting	Götzis, Austria	10th	Decathlon	8069
2006	European Championships	Gothenburg, Sweden	5th	Decathlon	8209, SB
2007	Hypo-Meeting	Götzis, Austria	9th	Decathlon	8199
2007	European U23 Championships	Debrecen, Hungary	2nd	Decathlon	8239 pts, SB
2008	Hypo-Meeting	Götzis, Austria	6th	Decathlon	8242, SB
2009	Hypo-Meeting	Götzis, Austria	3rd	Decathlon	8374
2009	World Championships	Berlin, Germany	6th	Decathlon	8439, PB
2010	Hypo-Meeting	Götzis, Austria	8th	Decathlon	8069
2011	World Championships	Daegu, South Korea	7th	Decathlon	8211
2012	Hypo-Meeting	Götzis, Austria	3rd	Decathlon	8433
2012	European Championships	Helsinki, Finland	1st	Decathlon	8558, PB
2012	Olympic Games	London, United Kingdom	10th	Decathlon	8126
2013	World Championships	Moscow, Russia	11th	Decathlon	8316
2014	World Indoor Championships	Sopot, Poland	8th	Heptathlon	4983
