= Eugène Martineau (athlete) =

Dutch decathlete

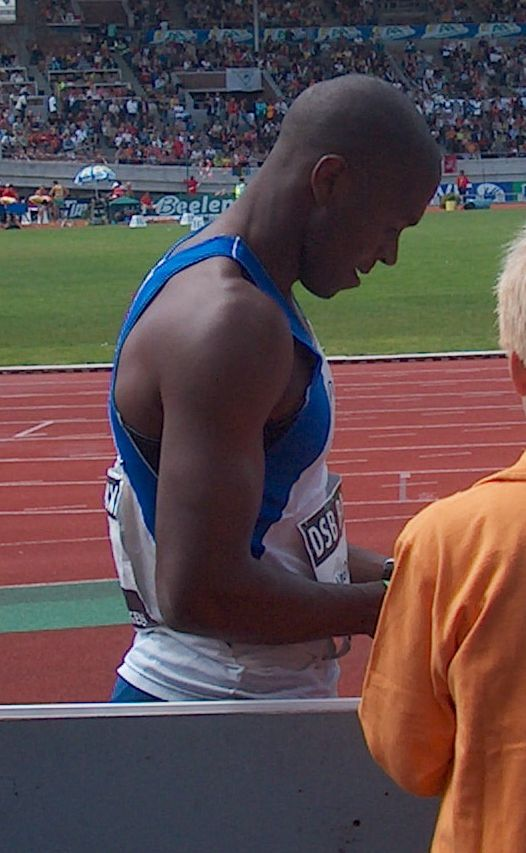
Martineau at the Dutch Championship decathlon in Amsterdam (2005).

Eugène Julien Martineau (born 14 May 1980 in Heerlen, Limburg) is a Dutch decathlete.

== Achievements ==
| Year | Competition | Venue | Position | Event | Notes |
Representing the Netherlands
| 2001 | European U23 Championships | Amsterdam, Netherlands | 8th | Decathlon | 7507 pts |
| 2002 | European Championships | Munich, Germany | — | Decathlon | DNF |
| 2004 | Hypo-Meeting | Götzis, Austria | 10th | Decathlon | 8082 pts |
| 2004 | Olympic Games | Athens, Greece | 29th | Decathlon | 7185 pts |
| 2005 | European Indoor Championships | Madrid, Spain | 8th | Heptathlon | 5766 pts |
| 2005 | Hypo-Meeting | Götzis, Austria | 6th | Decathlon | 8114 pts |
| 2005 | World Championships | Helsinki, Finland | — | Decathlon | DNF |
| 2006 | European Championships | Gothenburg, Sweden | 11th | Decathlon | 8035 pts |
| 2008 | Hypo-Meeting | Götzis, Austria | 9th | Decathlon | 8161 pts |
| 2008 | Olympic Games | Beijing, PR China | 14th | Decathlon | 8055 pts |
| 2009 | Hypo-Meeting | Götzis, Austria | 9th | Decathlon | 8083 pts |
| 2009 | World Championships | Berlin, Germany | 19th | Decathlon | 8055 pts |
