= Mikk Pahapill =

Estonian decathlete

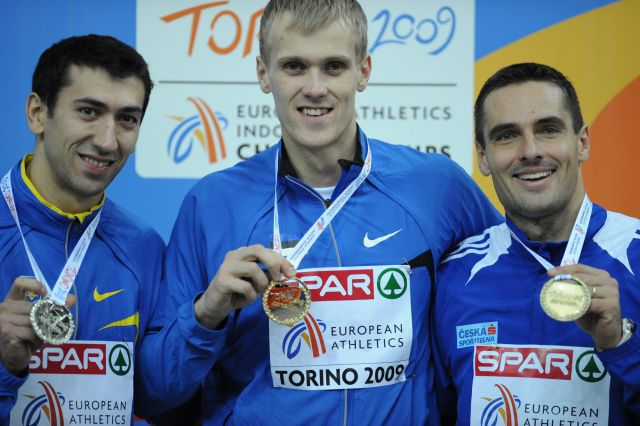
- Mikk Pahapill (centre) on the podium at 2009 European Indoor Championships with Oleksiy Kasyanov (left) and Roman Šebrle (right).

Personal information
- Full name: Mikk Pahapill
- Born: 18 July 1983 (age 43) Kuressaare, then part of Estonian SSR, Soviet Union
- Height: 196 cm (6 ft 5 in)
- Weight: 93 kg (205 lb)

Sport
- Country: Estonia
- Sport: Athletics
- Event: Decathlon

Achievements and titles
- Personal bests: Decathlon: 8398; Heptathlon: 6362
Medal record
Men's athletics
Representing Estonia
European Indoor Championships
Gold medal – first place	2009 Turin	Heptathlon

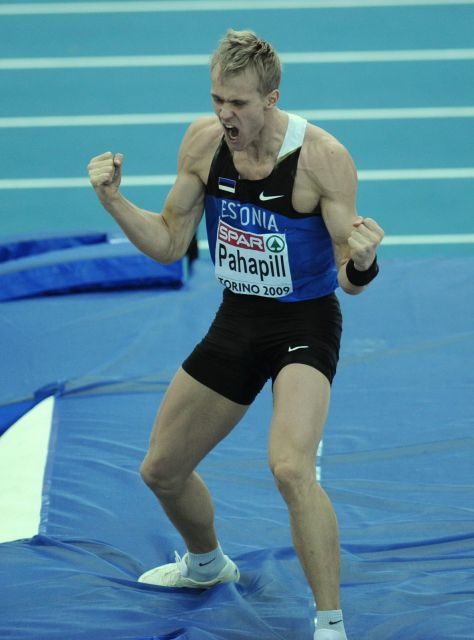
Mikk Pahapill in Turin 2009.

Mikk Pahapill (born 18 July 1983) is a retired Estonian decathlete. His personal best score is 8398 points, achieved at the 2011 Hypo-Meeting in Götzis. His coach is Remigija Nazarovienė. He won the 2009 European Indoor Championships in heptathlon with 6362 points, which is currently the 10th all-time result.

Pahapill was born in Kuressaare. Pahapill was the runner-up at the 2009 Décastar meeting with a then personal best score of 8255 points and runner-up at the 2011 competition with a result of 8184 points. He was also the runner-up at the 2010 European Cup Combined Events in Tallinn, recording a total of 8198 points to finish behind Romain Barras. Pahapill finished fourth at the 2010 European Championships where he broke his then personal record.

== Achievements ==
Year	Competition	Venue	Position	Event	Result	Notes
Representing Estonia
2002	World Junior Championships	Kingston, Jamaica	9th	Decathlon (junior)	7142 pts	
2005	Meeting International d'Arles	Arles, France	22nd	Decathlon	7214 pts	
2005	European Cup Combined Events Super League	Bydgoszcz, Poland	1st	Decathlon	8149 pts	PB
2005	World Championships	Helsinki, Finland	12th	Decathlon	8003 pts	
2005	Décastar	Talence, France	9th	Decathlon	7994 pts	
2006	Hypo-Meeting	Götzis, Austria	12th	Decathlon	8002 pts	
2006	European Cup Combined Events Super League	Arles, France	4th	Decathlon	7980 pts	
2006	European Championships	Gothenburg, Sweden	–	Decathlon	DNF	
2008	National Championships	Rakvere, Estonia	1st	Decathlon	8117 pts	
2008	Olympic Games	Beijing, China	10th	Decathlon	8178 pts	PB
2009	European Indoor Championships	Turin, Italy	1st	Heptathlon	6362 pts	WL, PB
2009	World Championships	Berlin, Germany	–	Decathlon	DNF	
2009	Décastar	Talence, France	2nd	Decathlon	8255 pts	PB
2010	Tallinn Indoor Meeting	Tallinn, Estonia	1st	Heptathlon	6156 pts	
2010	Hypo-Meeting	Götzis, Austria	7th	Decathlon	8084 pts	
2010	European Cup Combined Events Super League	Tallinn, Estonia	2nd	Decathlon	8198 pts	
2010	European Championships	Barcelona, Spain	4th	Decathlon	8298 pts	PB
2010	IAAF World Combined Events Challenge	IAAF	5th	Decathlon	24 580 pts	
2011	European Indoor Championships	Paris, France	13th	Heptathlon	5782 pts	
2011	Hypo-Meeting	Götzis, Austria	3rd	Decathlon	8398 pts	PB
2011	World Championships	Daegu, South Korea	9th	Decathlon	8164 pts	
2011	Décastar	Talence, France	2nd	Decathlon	8184 pts	
2011	IAAF World Combined Events Challenge	IAAF	3rd	Decathlon	24 746 pts	
2013	Tallinn Indoor Meeting	Tallinn, Estonia	1st	Heptathlon	6024 pts	
2013	European Cup Combined Events Super League	Tallinn, Estonia	3rd	Decathlon	8099 pts	
2013	World Championships	Moscow, Russia	17th	Decathlon	8170 pts	
2014	TNT - Fortuna Meeting	Kladno, Czech Republic	5th	Decathlon	7892 pts	
2014	Décastar	Talence, France	1st	Decathlon	8077 pts	

== Personal bests ==
=== Outdoors ===
Event	Result	Time	Place
100 meters	10,95 (+3,5); 11.01 (−0,4)	4 June 2005; 20 August 2009	Arles; Berlin
Long Jump	7,81 (+1,5); 7,81 (+2,6)	1 July 2006; 2 August 2009	Arles; Tallinn
Shot Put	15,51	17 September 2011	Talence
High Jump	2,15	1 July 2006	Arles
400 meters	49,84	10 August 2013	Moscow
110 meters hurdles	14,14 (+0,3)	20 September 2009	Talence
Discus Throw	50,66	6 August 2014	Tallinn
Pole vault	5,10	18 September 2011	Talence
Javelin throw	69,53	29 May 2011	Götzis
1500 meters	4,33.16	11 August 2013	Moscow
Decathlon	8398	28–29 May 2011	Götzis

=== Indoors ===
Event	Result	Time	Place
60 meters	7,03	14 February 2009	Tallinn
Long Jump	7,97	7 March 2009	Turin
Shot Put	15,73	20 January 2010	Tallinn
High Jump	2,12	7 March 2009	Turin
60 meters hurdles	7,97	20 February 2010	Tartu
Pole Vault	5,10	8 March 2009	Turin
1000 metres	2,45.69	8 March 2009	Turin
Heptathlon	6362	07–8 March 2009	Turin
