= Oleksandr Pyatnytsya =

Ukrainian javelin thrower (born 1985)

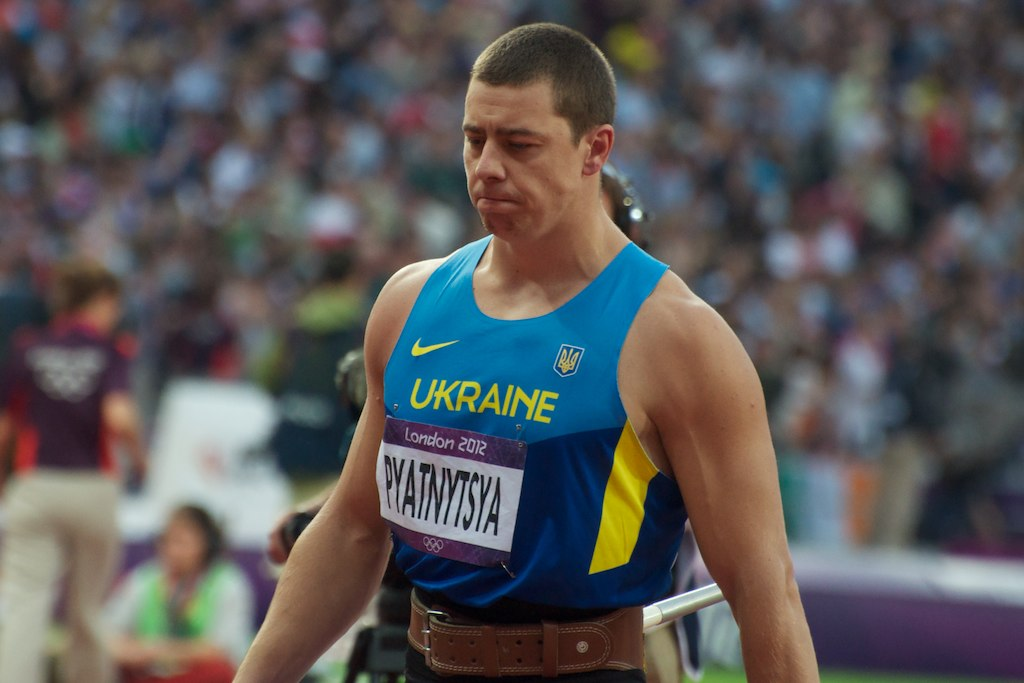

Personal information
- Born: July 14, 1985 (age 41) Dnipropetrovsk, Soviet Union
- Height: 1.86 m (6 ft 1 in)
- Weight: 90 kg (198 lb)
- Military career
- Allegiance: Ukraine
- Branch: Armed Forces of Ukraine
- Service years: 2020–present
- Conflicts: Russo-Ukrainian War; Russian invasion of Ukraine; Eastern Ukraine campaign; Battle of Donbas

Sport
- Country: Ukraine
- Sport: Athletics
- Event: Javelin
Medal record
Men's Athletics
Representing Ukraine
Olympic Games
Disqualified	2012 London	Javelin throw
Diamond League Final
Disqualified	2012	Javelin throw
European Throwing Cup
Silver medal – second place	2010 Arles	Javelin throw
Silver medal – second place	2011 Sofia	Javelin throw
European U23 Championships
Bronze medal – third place	2007 Debrecen	Javelin throw

Oleksandr Serhiiovich Pyatnytsya (Ukrainian: Олександр Сергійович П'ятниця; born 14 July 1985 in Dnipropetrovsk) is a male javelin thrower from Ukraine. His personal best is 86.12 metres, achieved in May 2012 in Kyiv, which was a new national record.

== Career ==
He won the bronze medal at the 2007 European U23 Championships and finished fifth at the 2009 World Athletics Final. He also competed at the 2009 and 2011 World Championships without reaching the final.

He initially was awarded the silver medal in the javelin throw at the 2012 London Olympics with a throw of 84.51m. In 2016 a reanalysis of samples from the 2012 Olympics resulted in a positive test for the anabolic steroid turinabol. He was stripped of his title by the IOC and ordered to return his silver medal, medalist pin and diploma.

In May 2017, he was disqualified for two years, due to doping violations.

== Personal life ==
In 2020, Pyatnytsya joined the Armed Forces of Ukraine. He remained with the military following the Russian invasion of Ukraine in 2022 as a training instructor, and was later deployed to eastern Ukraine.

== Achievements ==
Year	Competition	Venue	Position	Notes
2007	European U23 Championships	Debrecen, Hungary	3rd	76.28 m
2009	World Athletics Final	Thessaloniki, Greece	5th	80.60 m
2010	European Cup Winter Throwing	Arles, France	2nd	78.38 m
2010	European Championships	Barcelona, Spain	4th	82.01 m
2011	World Championships	Daegu, South Korea	29th (q)	73.56 m
2012	European Championships	Helsinki, Finland	5th	81.41 m
2012	Olympic Games	London, United Kingdom	DQ (2nd)	84.51 m
2014	European Championships	Zürich, Switzerland	21st (q)	74.69 m

== Seasonal bests by year ==
- 2007 – 76.28
- 2008 – 78.54
- 2009 – 81.96
- 2010 – 84.11
- 2011 – 82.61
- 2012 – 86.12
- 2013 – 77.46
- 2014 – 81.10
- 2015 – 81.63
