= Jake Arnold (decathlete) =

American decathlete (born 1984)

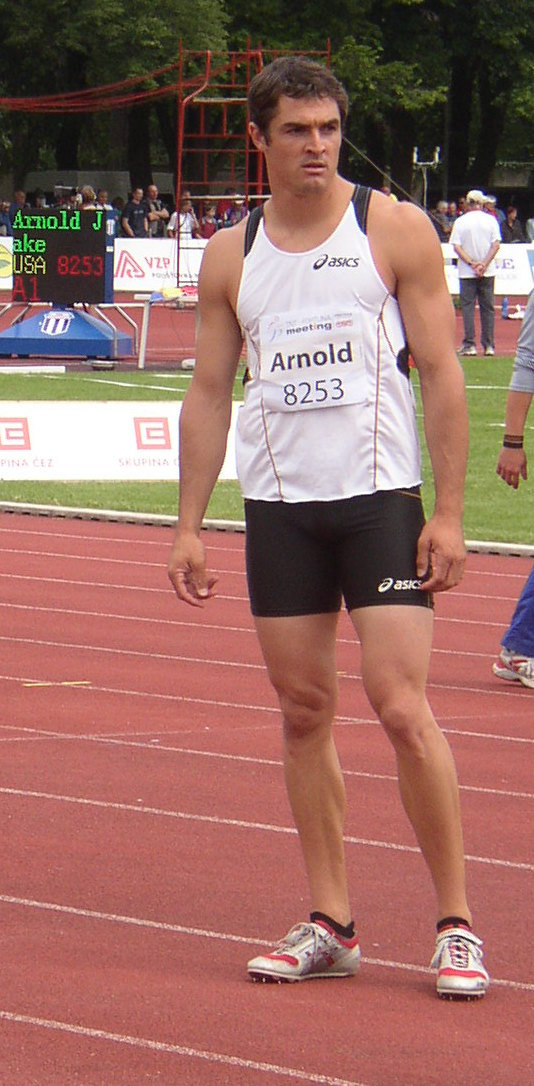
- Jake Arnold at the 2010 TNT - Fortuna Meeting in Kladno

Personal information
- Full name: Robert Jacob Arnold
- Born: January 3, 1984 (age 42) Santa Rosa, California, U.S.
- Home town: Santa Rosa, California
- Education: Maria Carrillo High School; University of Arizona

Sport
- Country: USA
- Event(s): Heptathlon, decathlon

Robert Jacob "Jake" Arnold (born January 3, 1984, in Santa Rosa, California) is a decathlete from the United States. He represented the United States in the decathlon at the 2007 and 2009 World Championships ranking 13th and 24th respectively. He became the first athlete to win back-to-back NCAA decathlon titles in over twenty years after winning the event in both 2006 and 2007.

His personal best in the decathlon is 8253 points, while his indoor heptathlon best is 5909 points.

== High school ==
Arnold went to his home town Maria Carrillo High School, where he qualified to the 2002 CIF California State Meet in three events, the 110 meters hurdles, the 300 meters hurdles and the pole vault.

== College career ==
He came to prominence with a number victories during his college career at the University of Arizona. He placed fifth in the heptathlon at the 2006 NCAA Men's Indoor Track and Field Championship, earning All-American honours, and won the Pac-10 decathlon title in the outdoor season with a personal best of 7691 points. He improved upon this with a total of 7870 points en route to winning his first decathlon title at the NCAA Men's Outdoor Track and Field Championship. He capped off the season by taking third place in the decathlon at the 2006 USA Outdoor Track and Field Championships, scoring 7827 points to finish behind Ryan Harlan and Tom Pappas.

The following year he was runner-up in the NCAA Indoor heptathlon competition and he managed to retain his Pac-10 decathlon title. Arnold became the first athlete in 22 years to win consecutive NCAA decathlon titles (following in the footsteps of Rob Muzzio), and he also recorded a personal record of 8215 points in the process. He again won the bronze medal at the USA Outdoor Championships, recording a total of 7921 points to finish behind Pappas and Paul Terek. This result gained him qualification into the 2007 World Championships in Athletics, which was held in Osaka, Japan. One of four American decathletes in the competition, Arnold finished in 13th place with a score of 8004 points, finishing ahead of Pappas and reigning world champion Bryan Clay who both dropped out of the competition.

== Professional career ==
At the USA Indoor Combined Events Championships, he finished with 5851 points to win his first US Indoor title. He attempted to gain qualification into the Summer Olympics at the 2008 US Olympic Trials in Eugene, Oregon. He finished with a two-day total of 8130 points, but this was only enough for fourth place behind Clay, Trey Hardee and Pappas, meaning that he would not gain one of the three berths for the 2008 Beijing Olympics. He recorded a season's best of 8191 at the USA vs. Germany Decathlon competition, finishing as runner-up behind Norman Müller and helping the United States to a team victory.

Arnold retained his US Indoor Heptathlon title in a victory with 5748 points. He made his first appearance on the European combined events circuit in 2009 as he opened his outdoor season at the Hypo Meeting in May. He recorded 8069 points to take tenth place overall. A performance of 7984 points was enough for third place at the 2009 USA Outdoor Track and Field Championships. This gained him entry into his second global-level event – the 2009 World Championships in Berlin. At the World Championships he opened with a 100 meters personal record of 11.01 seconds, but he did not maintain similar form in the other events and finished the competition with a total of 7837 points, leaving him in 24th in the final rankings.

Arnold won the 2009 and 2010 editions of the Multistars meeting in Desenzano del Garda. Arnold set a personal best of 8253 points in the decathlon at the 2010 Hypo-Meeting in Götzis for fourth place. He competed at the 2010 TNT - Fortuna Meeting in June and recorded personal bests in the 100 m (10.99 seconds) and the 110-meter hurdles (14.11 seconds). He finished with a points total of 8159 to take fifth place in the competition.

== Major competition record ==
Year	Competition	Venue	Position	Event	Notes
2007	World Championships	Osaka, Japan	13th	Decathlon	8004 pts
2009	World Championships	Berlin, Germany	24th	Decathlon	7837 pts

== Personal bests (outdoor) ==
Event	Performance	Location	Date
Decathlon	8253	Götzis	May 30, 2010
100 metres	10.99 (-0.1 m/s)	Kladno	June 15, 2010
400 metres	48.38	Sacramento	June 6, 2007
1500 metres	4:31.04	Indianapolis	June 24, 2006
110 metres hurdles	14.11 (0.5 m/s)	Kladno	June 16, 2010
High jump	2.07	Palo Alto	May 5, 2007
Pole vault	5.31	Provo	January 1, 2007
Long jump	7.22 (1.8 m/s)	Manhattan	August 2, 2008
Shot put	15.67	Desenzano del Garda	May 8, 2010
Discus throw	49.14	Des Moines	June 26, 2010
Javelin throw	62.28	Götzis	May 30, 2010

Last updated July 9, 2010.
