= Aleksey Sysoyev =

Russian decathlete

Aleksey Sysoyev (Russian: Алексей Сысоев; born 8 March 1985) is a Russian decathlete.

== International competitions ==
Representing Russia
Year	Competition	Venue	Position	Event	Notes
2003	European Junior Championships	Tampere, Finland	2nd	Decathlon junior	7531 pts
2004	World Junior Championships	Grosseto, Italy	2nd	Decathlon junior	8047 pts
2005	European U23 Championships	Erfurt, Germany	2nd	Decathlon	8089 pts
2005	World Championships	Helsinki, Finland	—	Decathlon	DNF
2006	European Championships	Gothenburg, Sweden	10th	Decathlon	8068 pts
2008	Olympic Games	Beijing, China	—	Decathlon	DNF

== Professional decathlons ==
Year	Competition	Venue	Position	Event	Notes
2006	Hypo-Meeting	Götzis, Austria	8th	Decathlon	8108 pts
2007	Hypo-Meeting	Götzis, Austria	—	Decathlon	DNF
2008	Hypo-Meeting	Götzis, Austria	2nd	Decathlon	8497 pts

== Personal bests ==
- 100 metres – 10.86 (2004)
- 400 metres – 48.89 (2006)
- 1500 metres – 4:29.94 (2006)
- 110 metres hurdles – 14.83 (2006)
- High jump – 2.16 (2005)
- Pole vault – 4.70 (2006)
- Long jump – 6.95 (2005)
- Shot put – 16.08 (2006)
- Discus throw – 53.49 (2005)
- Javelin throw – 59.60 (2005)
- Decathlon – 8108 (2006)
