= Norman Müller =

German decathlete

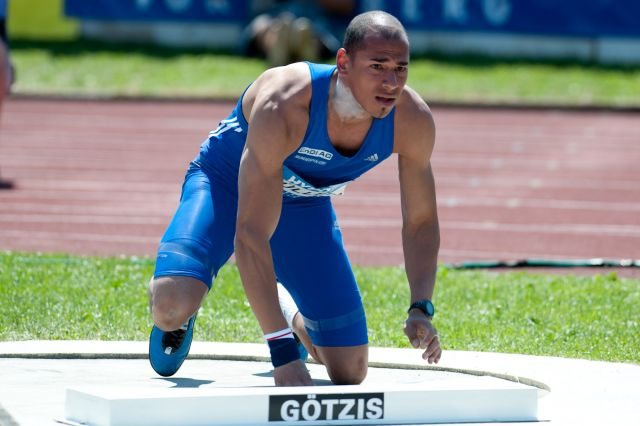
Norman Müller during the 2012 Hypo-Meeting

Norman Müller (born 7 August 1985 in Eisleben, Saxony-Anhalt) is a German decathlete. He won the men's national title in the decathlon in 2008.

== Competition record ==
Year	Competition	Venue	Position	Event	Notes
Representing Germany
2004	World Junior Championships	Grosseto, Italy	3rd	Decathlon (junior)	7942 pts
2005	European U23 Championships	Erfurt, Germany	3rd	Decathlon	7989 pts
2006	Hypo-Meeting	Götzis, Austria	9th	Decathlon	8093 pts
2007	Hypo-Meeting	Götzis, Austria	7th	Decathlon	8255 pts
2007	World Championships	Osaka, Japan	22nd	Decathlon	7344 pts
2008	Hypo-Meeting	Götzis, Austria	—	Decathlon	DNF
2009	Hypo-Meeting	Götzis, Austria	6th	Decathlon	8272 pts
2009	World Championships	Berlin, Germany	16th	Decathlon	8096 pts
2012	European Championships	Helsinki, Finland	7th	Decathlon	8003 pts
