= Roland Schwarzl =

Austrian decathlete (born 1980)

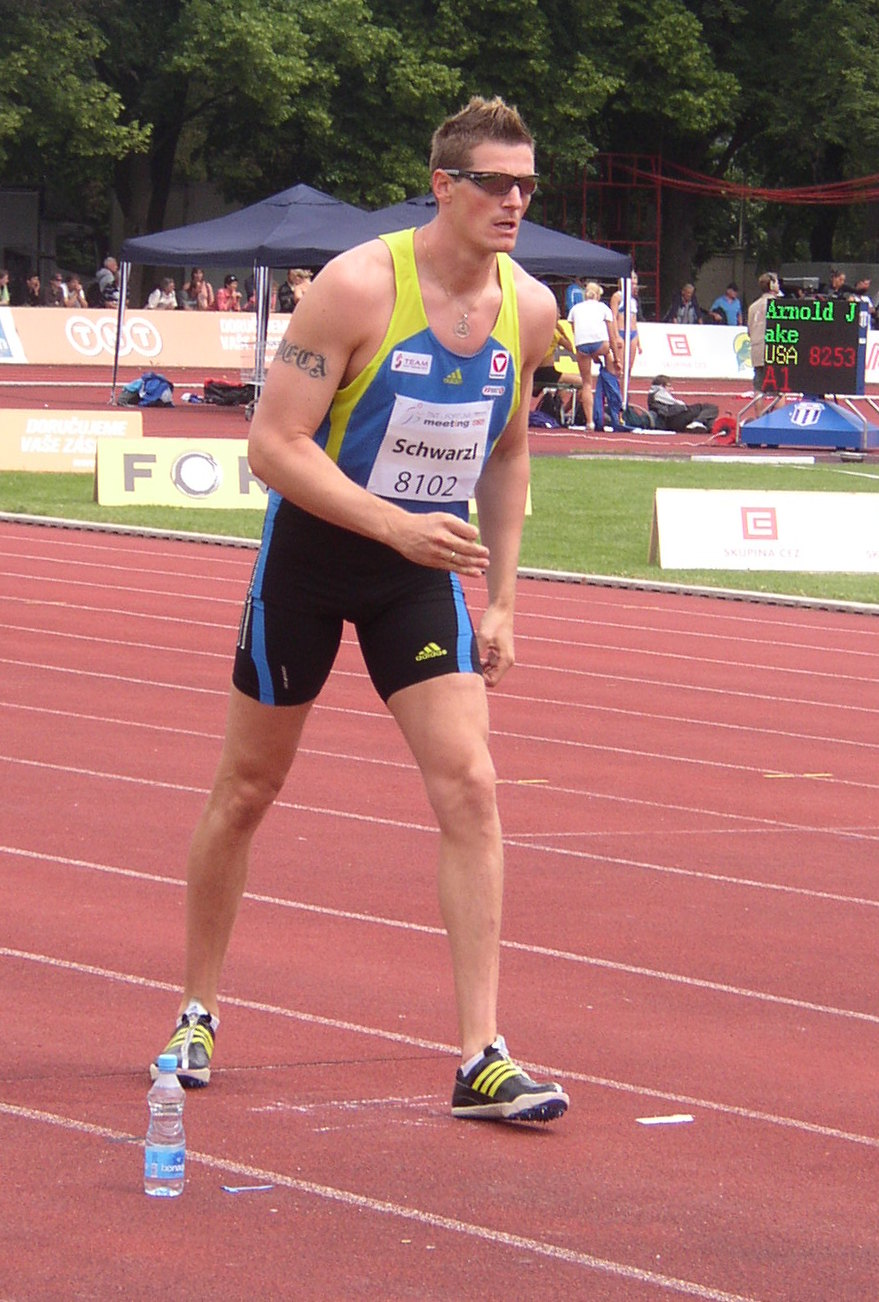
Roland Schwarzl at the 2010 TNT - Fortuna Meeting in Kladno

Roland Schwartzl (born 10 December 1980 in Lienz) is a decathlete from Austria.

He has won 5 pole vault and 3 heptathlon tiles since 1999 in the Austrian Indoor Championships. He also won both the decathlon and long jump in the Austrian Championships in 2003. His greatest achievement as a junior came in the 1999 European Junior Championships where he won the decathlon. He is currently married to his long time girlfriend, Rameera Jaj. He is currently working in Sunway International School KL as a physical education teacher.

== Achievements ==
Year	Competition	Venue	Position	Event	Notes
Representing Austria
1998	World Junior Championships	Annecy, France	—	Decathlon	DNF
1999	Hypo-Meeting	Götzis, Austria	—	Decathlon	DNF
1999	European Junior Championships	Riga, Latvia	3rd	Decathlon	7447 pts
2000	Hypo-Meeting	Götzis, Austria	—	Decathlon	DNF
2001	European U23 Championships	Amsterdam, Netherlands	12th	Decathlon	7287 pts
2002	Hypo-Meeting	Götzis, Austria	15th	Decathlon	7767 pts
2003	Hypo-Meeting	Götzis, Austria	—	Decathlon	DNF
2004	Hypo-Meeting	Götzis, Austria	11th	Decathlon	8067 pts
2004	Olympic Games	Athens, Greece	10th	Decathlon	8102 pts
2005	European Indoor Championships	Madrid, Spain	3rd	Heptathlon	6064 pts
2005	Hypo-Meeting	Götzis, Austria	8th	Decathlon	7975 pts
2005	World Championships	Helsinki, Finland	15th	Decathlon	7549 pts
2006	Hypo-Meeting	Götzis, Austria	16th	Decathlon	7644 pts
2009	Hypo-Meeting	Götzis, Austria	15th	Decathlon	7971 pts
2011	European Indoor Championships	Paris, France	10th	Heptathlon	5846 pts
