= Romain Barras =

French decathlete (born 1980)

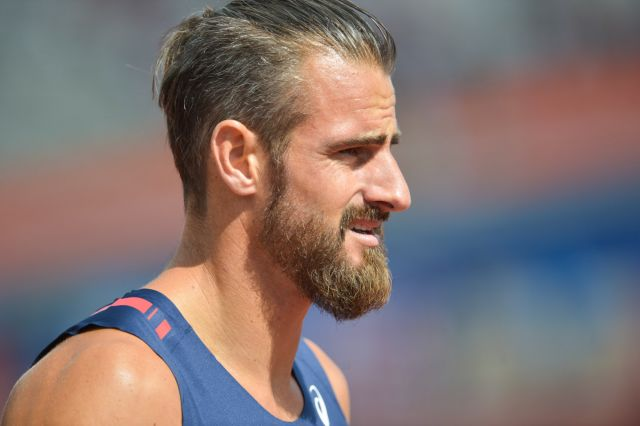
Romain Barras in 2016

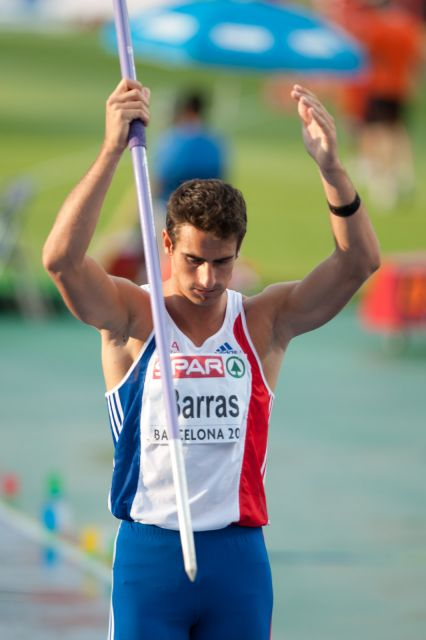
Romain Barras at the 2010 European Athletics Championships in Barcelona

Romain Barras (born 1 August 1980 in Calais, Pas-de-Calais) is a French decathlete. At the Universiade he finished fifth in 2001 and first in 2003, the latter in a personal-best score of 8,196 points. He represented France at the 2004 Summer Olympics and came in thirteenth place overall in the decathlon. He became the regional champion at the 2005 Mediterranean Games.

He improved his personal best to 8,298 points for third place at the 2007 TNT - Fortuna Meeting. He finished fifth in the decathlon at the 2008 Beijing Olympics and was twelfth at the 2009 World Championships in Athletics. Barras set a personal best of 8,313 points to win at the 2010 European Cup Combined Events in Tallinn, Estonia.

On 29 July 2010, Barras won the decathlon gold medal at the 2010 European Championships in Barcelona with a score of 8,453. He took part in the 2010 Décastar meeting in September and finished third with 8,180 points.

Following the end of his competitive career, he focused on coaching and was a professor of sports and physical education.

== Achievements ==
Year	Competition	Venue	Position	Event	Notes
Representing France
2001	European U23 Championships	Amsterdam, Netherlands	4th	Decathlon	7,821 pts
2001	World Student Games	Beijing, China	5th	Decathlon	7,876 pts
2003	World Student Games	Daegu, South Korea	1st	Decathlon	8,196 pts
2004	Olympic Games	Athens, Greece	13th	Decathlon	8,067 pts
2005	Hypo-Meeting	Götzis, Austria	5th	Decathlon	8,185 pts
2005	Mediterranean Games	Almería, Spain	1st	Decathlon	8,127 pts
2005	World Championships	Helsinki, Finland	7th	Decathlon	8,087 pts
2005	Décastar	Talence, France	5th	Decathlon	8,060 pts
2006	Hypo-Meeting	Götzis, Austria	7th	Decathlon	8,138 pts
2006	European Championships	Gothenburg, Sweden	8th	Decathlon	8,093 pts
2007	European Indoor Championships	Birmingham, England	6th	Heptathlon	5,883 pts
2007	Hypo-Meeting	Götzis, Austria	10th	Decathlon	8,064 pts
2008	Olympic Games	Beijing, China	5th	Decathlon	8,253 pts
2009	World Championships	Berlin, Germany	12th	Decathlon	8,204 pts
2010	European Championships	Barcelona, Spain	1st	Decathlon	8,453 pts
2011	World Championships	Daegu, South Korea	11th	Decathlon	8,134 pts
2016	European Championships	Amsterdam, Netherlands	6th	Decathlon	8,002 pts
