= Kislov =

Kislov (Russian: Кислов) is a Russian male surname. Its feminine counterpart is Kislova. Notable people with the surname include:

- Aleksandr Kislov (born 1984), Russian decathlete
- Igor Kislov (born 1966), Ukrainian association football player
- Aleksandra Kislova (born 1946), Russian chess master
- Kaleria Kislova (1926–2025), Soviet and Russian television director
- Marina Kislova (born 1978), Russian sprinter
- Yelizaveta Dementyeva (born Yelizaveta Kislova, 1928–2022), Soviet sprint canoer
