= 2012 Hypo-Meeting =

The 38th edition of the annual Hypo-Meeting took place on 26 and 27 May 2012 in Götzis, Austria. The track and field competition, featuring a men's decathlon and a women's heptathlon event was part of the 2012 IAAF World Combined Events Challenge. Hans van Alphen and Jessica Ennis led the men's and women's competition, respectively, after the first day. Ennis (6906 points) and van Alphen (8516 points) were the winners of the events overall. Ennis' score was a British record.

== Men's Decathlon ==
=== Schedule ===
May 26
1. 100 m
2. Long Jump
3. Shot Put
4. High Jump
5. 400 m

May 27
6. 110 m hurdles
7. Discus Throw
8. Pole Vault
9. Javelin Throw
10. 1,500 m

=== Records ===
World Record	Roman Šebrle (CZE)	9026	May 27, 2001	Götzis, Austria
Event Record	Roman Šebrle (CZE)	9026	May 27, 2001	Götzis, Austria

=== Results ===
The best mark recorded in each event is highlighted in yellow

Rank	Athlete	Decathlon										Points
Rank	Athlete	1	2	3	4	5	6	7	8	9	10	Points
1	Hans Van Alphen (BEL)	10.96	7.62	15.26	2.06	49.54	14.55	45.45	4.96	64.15	4:20.87	8519
2	Eelco Sintnicolaas (NED)	10.77	7.27	14.20	2.00	48.02	14.10	42.81	5.36	63.59	4:26.98	8506
3	Pascal Behrenbruch (GER)	11.11	7.09	16.26	2.03	48.64	14.19	47.99	4.86	66.72	4:36.88	8433
4	Rico Freimuth (GER)	10.62	7.16	15.14	1.91	47.51	13.79	47.26	4.86	58.05	4:40.55	8322
5	Leonel Suárez (CUB)	11.35	6.85	13.95	2.09	49.33	14.34	44.71	4.86	71.99	4:23.26	8289
6	Ingmar Vos (NED)	10.92	7.36	14.14	2.06	49.50	14.35	43.31	4.76	63.89	4:34.47	8224
7	Yordani García (CUB)	10.94	6.56	14.99	2.06	49.30	14.37	41.96	4.66	65.36	4:33.10	8061
8	Norman Müller (GER)	10.90	7.29	14.55	2.00	49.55	14.94	40.38	5.06	56.90	4:33.86	8034
9	Damian Warner (CAN)	10.59	7.11	12.96	1.94	48.58	13.78	39.59	4.56	57.00	4:30.42	7961
10	Simon Hechler (GER)	10.89	7.41	13.13	1.91	50.61	14.74	41.99	4.76	61.58	4:35.20	7879
11	Gaël Quérin (FRA)	11.26	7.04	12.80	2.00	48.81	14.62	40.02	4.96	51.33	4:18.76	7842
12	Ashley Bryant (GBR)	11.02	7.38	13.42	1.82	48.87	14.69	39.70	4.56	69.26	4:41.47	7837
13	Yunior Díaz (CUB)	10.99	7.33	14.17	1.91	47.16	14.95	41.52	4.26	52.82	4:33.12	7765
14	Scott McLaren (NZL)	11.18	6.87	14.45	1.88	50.03	15.14	43.43	4.76	60.45	4:34.63	7733
15	Cedric Nolf (BEL)	11.04	7.18	13.19	1.91	50.08	14.69	39.89	4.86	62.64	5:06.80	7638
16	Dominik Distelberger (AUT)	10.99	7.11	12.62	1.88	49.76	14.66	38.99	4.76	56.48	DNF	6926
17	Adam Sebastian Helcelet (CZE)	10.90	7.34	14.99	2.03	49.18	DQ	35.49	4.86	58.88	DNF	6415
—	Roman Šebrle (CZE)	11.38	7.25	14.41	2.00	DNF	14.88	44.50	4.86	58.48	DNS	DNF
—	Carlos Chinn (BRA)	11.04	7.24	13.85	2.03	50.54	14.56	43.25	4.06	DNS	—	DNF
—	Brent Newdick (NZL)	11.10	7.16	13.79	1.91	50.52	14.97	45.08	4.36	DNS	—	DNF
—	Eduard Mikhan (BLR)	10.68	7.29	14.64	1.94	48.99	14.20	48.61	NM	DNS	—	DNF
—	Michael Schrader (GER)	10.84	7.61	13.47	1.97	48.53	14.40	43.57	NM	DNS	—	DNF
—	Simon Walter (SUI)	11.34	6.79	12.97	NM	50.67	DNS	—	—	—	—	DNF
—	Andrei Krauchanka (BLR)	11.31	7.34	14.55	1.94	DNS	—	—	—	—	—	DNF
—	Roland Schwarzl (AUT)	11.59	7.19	13.74	1.91	DNS	—	—	—	—	—	DNF
—	Jan Felix Knobel (GER)	11.25	7.22	15.37	NM	DNS	—	—	—	—	—	DNF

== Women's heptathlon ==
=== Schedule ===
May 26
1. 100 m hurdles
2. High Jump
3. Shot Put
4. 200 m

May 27
5. Long Jump
6. Javelin Throw
7. 800 m

=== Records ===
World Record	Jackie Joyner-Kersee (USA)	7291	September 24, 1988	Seoul, South Korea
Event Record	Sabine Braun (GER)	6985	May 31, 1992	Götzis, Austria

=== Results ===
The best mark recorded in each event is highlighted in yellow

Rank	Athlete	Heptathlon							Points
Rank	Athlete	1	2	3	4	5	6	7	Points
1	Jessica Ennis-Hill (GBR)	12.81	1.85	14.51	22.88	6.51	47.11	2:09.00	6906
2	Tatyana Chernova (RUS) DISQUALIFIED	13.34	1.82	13.75	23.49	6.44	53.21	2:08.94	6774
3	Austra Skujytė (LTU)	14.18	1.91	16.49	25.31	6.31	49.18	2:20.94	6493
4	Lilli Schwarzkopf (GER)	13.51	1.82	14.13	24.86	6.07	53.18	2:13.57	6461
5	Jessica Zelinka (CAN)	13.02	1.73	14.56	23.46	5.86	43.43	2:09.19	6393
6	Dafne Schippers (NED)	13.43	1.73	13.82	22.73	6.49	40.41	2:18.66	6360
7	Jennifer Oeser (GER)	13.54	1.82	13.56	24.55	6.19	47.83	2:16.05	6345
8	Natallia Dobrynska (UKR)	13.97	1.82	15.61	25.14	6.31	44.40	2:17.98	6311
9	Nadine Broersen (NED)	13.82	1.85	13.62	25.73	6.09	54.97	2:19.59	6298
10	Laura Ikauniece (LAT)	13.90	1.82	12.67	24.43	6.09	49.56	2:13.68	6282
11	Antoinette Nana Djimou Ida (FRA)	13.37	1.82	14.62	24.82	5.81	51.55	2:22.72	6279
12	Margaret Simpson (GHA)	13.85	1.79	12.43	24.96	6.07	55.90	2:17.88	6245
13	Jessica Samuelsson (SWE)	13.66	1.73	14.73	23.86	5.95	39.43	2:08.77	6228
14	Claudia Rath (GER)	14.02	1.76	13.27	24.57	6.30	41.57	2:09.43	6189
15	Sharon Day-Monroe (USA)	13.68	1.79	14.06	24.09	5.97	37.23	2:11.54	6156
16	Maren Schwerdtner (GER)	13.62	1.73	13.77	24.46	6.44	44.56	2:23.89	6154
17	Sarah Cowley (NZL)	14.02	1.91	13.22	25.48	6.12	40.66	2:15.37	6135
18	Julia Mächtig (GER)	14.62	1.73	15.71	25.15	6.17	47.76	2:19.78	6110
19	Sara Aerts (BEL)	13.06	1.64	13.61	23.47	6.08	36.49	2:14.12	6077
20	Yana Maksimava (BLR)	14.11	1.91	13.54	25.21	5.81	38.46	2:14.72	6040
21	Györgyi Zsivoczky-Farkas (HUN)	14.27	1.82	13.30	25.70	5.99	45.61	2:14.93	6030
22	Ivona Dadic (AUT)	14.63	1.76	12.45	24.11	6.14	38.12	2:10.67	5959
23	Eliška Klučinová (CZE)	14.26	1.85	12.97	25.10	5.96	42.71	2:28.68	5852
24	Ida Marcussen (NOR)	14.68	1.67	12.87	25.20	5.85	41.59	2:13.48	5706
25	Kateřina Cachová (CZE)	14.64	1.79	10.56	25.02	5.74	40.19	2:17.99	5600
26	Elodie Jakob (SUI)	14.36	1.64	11.63	26.11	5.58	41.52	2:22.93	5339
—	Yasmina Omrani (FRA)	14.07	1.73	12.96	24.62	5.48	DNS	—	DNF
—	Lyudmyla Yosypenko (UKR)	DQ	DQ	DQ	DQ	DQ	DQ	DQ	DQ
