= Halvari =

Halvari is a Finnish surname. Notable people with the surname include:

- Mika Halvari (born 1970), Finnish shot putter
- Mikko Halvari (born 1983), Finnish decathlete
