= 2011 European Athletics Indoor Championships – Men's heptathlon =

Study's

The Men's heptathlon event at the 2011 European Athletics Indoor Championships was held at March 5 and 6.

== Records ==
Standing records prior to the 2011 European Athletics Indoor Championships
World record	Ashton Eaton (USA)	6568	Tallinn, Estonia	6 February 2011
European record	Roman Šebrle (CZE)	6438	Budapest, Hungary	7 March 2004
Championship record	Tomáš Dvořák (CZE)	6424	Gent, Belgium	26 February 2000
World Leading	Ashton Eaton (USA)	6568	Tallinn, Estonia	6 February 2011
European Leading	Roman Šebrle (CZE)	6117	Prague, Czech Republic	13 February 2011

== Results ==
=== 60 metres ===
The heats were held at 9:00.

Rank	Heat	Lane	Name	Nationality	Time	Points	Notes
1	2	7	Ingmar Vos	Netherlands	6.89	922	PB
2	2	1	Darius Draudvila	Lithuania	6.90	918	
3	2	2	Dominik Distelberger	Austria	6.92	911	
4	2	3	Eduard Mikhan	Belarus	7.04	868	
5	2	6	Andres Raja	Estonia	7.06	861	
5	2	8	Roman Šebrle	Czech Republic	7.06	861	SB
7	2	4	Eelco Sintnicolaas	Netherlands	7.07	858	
8	1	8	Nadir El Fassi	France	7.09	851	
8	1	6	Andrei Krauchanka	Belarus	7.09	851	
10	2	5	Florian Geffrouais	France	7.11	844	
10	1	3	Vasiliy Kharlamov	Russia	7.11	844	SB
12	1	4	Aleksandr Kislov	Russia	7.12	840	SB
13	1	5	Hans Van Alphen	Belgium	7.20	813	=PB
14	1	1	Mikk Pahapill	Estonia	7.21	809	
15	1	7	Thomas Van Der Plaetsen	Belgium	7.23	802	PB
16	1	2	Roland Schwarzl	Austria	7.27	789	SB

=== Long jump ===
The event was held at 9:40.

Rank	Athlete	Nationality	#1	#2	#3	Result	Points	Notes	Total
1	Roman Šebrle	Czech Republic	7.51	7.59	7.28	7.59	957		1818
2	Nadir El Fassi	France	7.41	7.44	7.51	7.51	937	PB	1788
3	Andrei Krauchanka	Belarus	x	7.49	7.11	7.49	932		1783
4	Thomas Van Der Plaetsen	Belgium	7.48	x	x	7.48	930		1732
5	Roland Schwarzl	Austria	7.11	x	7.41	7.41	913	=SB	1702
6	Darius Draudvila	Lithuania	7.40	x	7.36	7.40	910	SB	1828
7	Ingmar Vos	Netherlands	7.36	7.34	x	7.36	900		1822
8	Mikk Pahapill	Estonia	7.26	7.33	7.17	7.33	893		1702
9	Vasiliy Kharlamov	Russia	7.31	7.13	7.20	7.31	888		1732
10	Eduard Mikhan	Belarus	4.84	7.30	7.22	7.30	886	SB	1754
11	Hans Van Alphen	Belgium	x	6.99	7.26	7.26	876	=SB	1689
12	Eelco Sintnicolaas	Netherlands	7.08	7.25	7.13	7.25	874		1732
13	Dominik Distelberger	Austria	x	6.95	7.17	7.17	854		1765
14	Florian Geffrouais	France	6.98	6.80	x	6.98	809	PB	1653
15	Aleksandr Kislov	Russia	x	6.70	6.92	6.92	795		1635
	Andres Raja	Estonia				DNS	o		DNF

=== Shot Put ===
The event was held at 11:30.

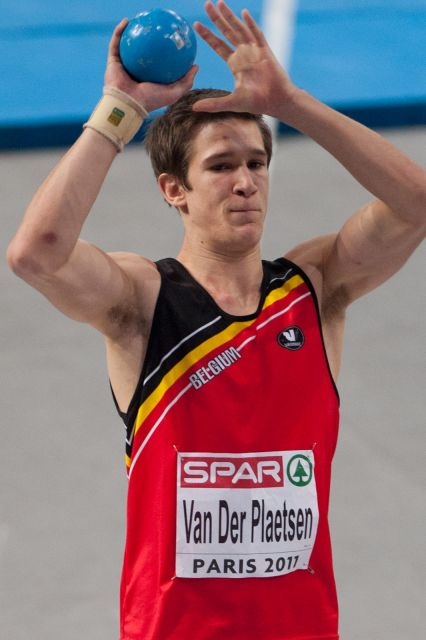
Thomas Van Der Plaetsen of Belgium during the shot put competition.

Rank	Athlete	Nationality	#1	#2	#3	Result	Points	Notes	Total
1	Vasiliy Kharlamov	Russia	x	15.48	x	15.48	819		2551
2	Roman Šebrle	Czech Republic	15.42	15.03	x	15.42	816		2634
3	Hans Van Alphen	Belgium	15.26	14.87	x	15.26	806		2495
4	Mikk Pahapill	Estonia	15.16	15.16	14.84	15.16	800		2502
5	Darius Draudvila	Lithuania	14.87	14.81	15.08	15.08	795		2623
6	Andrei Krauchanka	Belarus	15.04	14.81	x	15.04	792	PB	2575
7	Roland Schwarzl	Austria	14.81	14.74	x	14.81	778	SB	2480
8	Florian Geffrouais	France	13.50	14.78	x	14.78	776		2429
9	Aleksandr Kislov	Russia	x	14.50	14.46	14.50	759		2394
10	Eelco Sintnicolaas	Netherlands	13.90	13.59	14.46	14.46	757	PB	2489
11	Nadir El Fassi	France	13.86	14.13	x	14.13	736	PB	2524
12	Ingmar Vos	Netherlands	12.92	12.50	13.74	13.74	712	SB	2534
13	Eduard Mikhan	Belarus	13.68	13.45	x	13.68	709		2463
14	Thomas Van Der Plaetsen	Belgium	13.16	x	x	13.16	677	PB	2409
15	Dominik Distelberger	Austria	12.37	12.42	12.32	12.42	632		2397

=== High jump ===
The event was held at 16:30.

Rank	Athlete	Nationality	1.85	1.88	1.91	1.94	1.97	2.00	2.03	2.06	2.09	2.12	2.15	Result	Points	Notes	Total
1	Nadir El Fassi	France	–	–	o	xo	o	o	o	o	xxo	o	x–	2.12	915	PB	3439
2	Aleksandr Kislov	Russia	–	–	o	–	o	xo	xo	o	o	xxx		2.09	887	PB	3281
3	Andrei Krauchanka	Belarus	–	–	o	o	o	o	xo	xxo	o	xxx		2.09	887		3462
4	Roman Šebrle	Czech Republic	–	–	–	o	–	o	o	o	xxx			2.06	859		3493
5	Thomas Van Der Plaetsen	Belgium	–	–	–	o	–	o	o	xxo	xxx			2.06	859	PB	3268
6	Mikk Pahapill	Estonia	–	–	o	o	o	xo	xo	xxx				2.03	831		3333
7	Ingmar Vos	Netherlands	–	–	o	–	o	o	xxx					2.00	803		3337
8	Vasiliy Kharlamov	Russia	o	o	o	o	xxo	xxo	xxx					2.00	803	PB	3354
9	Darius Draudvila	Lithuania	–	o	o	o	o	xxx						1.97	776	SB	3399
10	Eduard Mikhan	Belarus	o	o	o	o	xo	xxx						1.97	776	SB	3239
11	Eelco Sintnicolaas	Netherlands	–	o	xo	xo	xxo	xxx						1.97	776	SB	3265
12	Hans Van Alphen	Belgium	o	o	o	o	xxx							1.94	749	PB	3244
13	Roland Schwarzl	Austria	o	o	xo	o	xxx							1.94	749	SB	3229
14	Florian Geffrouais	France	o	o	o	xxx								1.91	723		3152
15	Dominik Distelberger	Austria	xo	o	xo	xxx								1.91	723		3120

=== 60 metres hurdles ===
The heats were held at 9:45.

Rank	Heat	Lane	Name	Nationality	Time	Points	Notes	Total
1	2	4	Dominik Distelberger	Austria	7.87	1015	PB	4135
2	2	2	Ingmar Vos	Netherlands	8.00	982		4319
3	2	6	Eelco Sintnicolaas	Netherlands	8.03	974		4239
4	2	3	Andrei Krauchanka	Belarus	8.04	972		4434
5	2	5	Darius Draudvila	Lithuania	8.04	972		4371
6	2	7	Roman Šebrle	Czech Republic	8.08	962		4455
7	2	8	Aleksandr Kislov	Russia	8.08	962		4243
8	1	4	Nadir El Fassi	France	8.13	949	PB	4388
9	1	3	Eduard Mikhan	Belarus	8.15	944		4183
10	1	5	Thomas Van Der Plaetsen	Belgium	8.18	937	=PB	4205
11	1	6	Vasiliy Kharlamov	Russia	8.25	920		4274
12	1	8	Roland Schwarzl	Austria	8.27	915	SB	4144
13	1	7	Hans Van Alphen	Belgium	8.30	908	SB	4152
14	2	1	Mikk Pahapill	Estonia	8.42	879		4212
15	1	2	Florian Geffrouais	France	8.43	877		4029

=== Pole vault ===
The event was held at 10:30.

Rank	Athlete	Nationality	4.00	4.30	4.40	4.50	4.60	4.70	4.80	4.90	5.00	5.10	5.20	5.30	5.40	5.50	5.60	Result	Points	Notes	Total
1	Eelco Sintnicolaas	Netherlands	–	–	–	–	–	–	–	–	–	–	o	–	xxo	xxo	xxx	5.50	1067		5306
2	Thomas Van Der Plaetsen	Belgium	–	–	–	–	–	–	o	–	o	o	xo	xxx				5.20	972	PB	5177
2	Andrei Krauchanka	Belarus	–	–	–	–	–	–	xo	–	o	o	xxo	xxx				5.20	972	SB	5406
4	Roland Schwarzl	Austria	–	–	–	–	–	o	–	o	o	o	xxx					5.10	941	SB	5085
5	Aleksandr Kislov	Russia	–	–	–	–	xo	–	o	–	o	xo	xxx					5.10	941		5184
6	Nadir El Fassi	France	–	–	o	–	o	xo	o	xo	o	xxx						5.00	910	PB	5298
7	Florian Geffrouais	France	–	–	–	–	o	–	xo	xo	xo	xxx						5.00	910	PB	4939
8	Vasiliy Kharlamov	Russia	–	–	–	–	o	–	o	xo	xxx							4.90	880	=SB	5154
8	Hans Van Alphen	Belgium	–	–	o	–	o	o	o	xo	xxx							4.90	880	PB	5032
10	Roman Šebrle	Czech Republic	–	–	o	–	o	–	o	xxo	xxx							4.90	880	=SB	5335
11	Ingmar Vos	Netherlands	–	–	o	o	xo	xo	o	xxx								4.80	849	=PB	5168
12	Mikk Pahapill	Estonia	–	–	o	o	–	o	xxx									4.70	819		5031
13	Eduard Mikhan	Belarus	–	–	o	xxo	xxx											4.50	760	=SB	4943
14	Darius Draudvila	Lithuania	xo	o	–	–	–											4.30	702		5073
	Dominik Distelberger	Austria	–															NM	0		4135

=== 1000 metres ===
The race was held at 15:00.

Rank	Name	Nationality	Time	Points	Notes
1	Nadir El Fassi	France	2:34.19	939	CB
2	Hans Van Alphen	Belgium	2:37.06	906	PB
3	Eduard Mikhan	Belarus	2:37.51	901	PB
4	Andrei Krauchanka	Belarus	2:39.80	876	PB
5	Eelco Sintnicolaas	Netherlands	2:40.44	869	
6	Florian Geffrouais	France	2:41.54	856	
7	Ingmar Vos	Netherlands	2:41.91	852	
8	Roman Šebrle	Czech Republic	2:42.72	843	SB
9	Thomas Van Der Plaetsen	Belgium	2:42.80	843	PB
10	Vasiliy Kharlamov	Russia	2:46.23	805	
11	Aleksandr Kislov	Russia	2:48.09	786	SB
12	Roland Schwarzl	Austria	2:50.41	761	SB
13	Mikk Pahapill	Estonia	2:51.40	751	
	Dominik Distelberger	Austria	DNF	0	
	Darius Draudvila	Lithuania	DNF	0	

=== Final standings ===
After the seven disciplines this was the final standing.

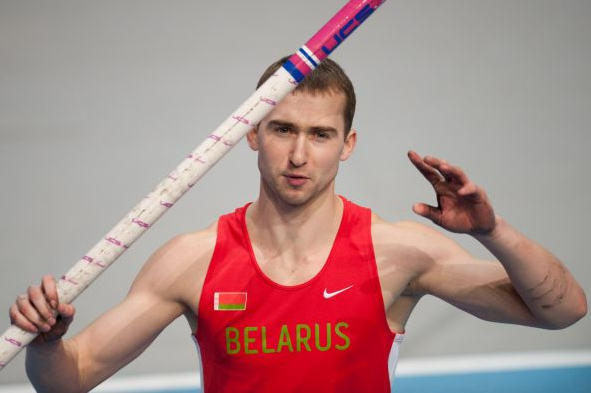
Andrei Krauchanka won the event with a new Belarusian record.

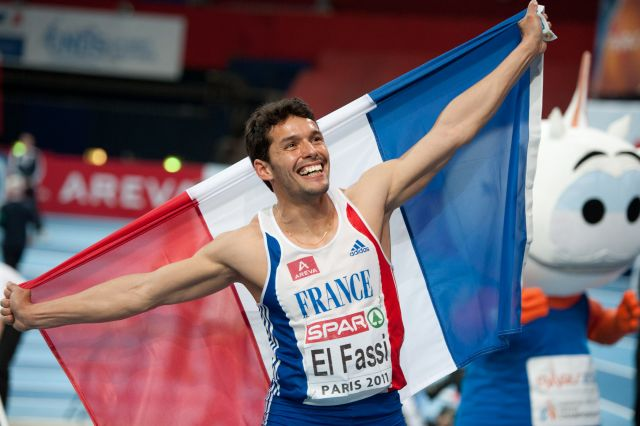
Nadir El Fassi took the silver for France.

Place	Athlete	Nation	Points	Notes
1st place, gold medalist(s)	Andrei Krauchanka	Belarus	6282	EL, NR
2nd place, silver medalist(s)	Nadir El Fassi	France	6237	PB
3rd place, bronze medalist(s)	Roman Šebrle	Czech Republic	6178	SB
4	Eelco Sintnicolaas	Netherlands	6175	NR
5	Ingmar Vos	Netherlands	6020	PB
6	Thomas Van Der Plaetsen	Belgium	6020	PB
7	Aleksandr Kislov	Russia	5970	SB
8	Vasiliy Kharlamov	Russia	5959	
9	Hans Van Alphen	Belgium	5938	PB
10	Roland Schwarzl	Austria	5846	SB
11	Eduard Mikhan	Belarus	5844	
12	Florian Geffrouais	France	5795	PB
13	Mikk Pahapill	Estonia	5782	
14	Darius Draudvila	Lithuania	5073	
15	Dominik Distelberger	Austria	4135	
	Andres Raja	Estonia	DNF	
