= 2010 European Athletics Championships – Men's decathlon =

Men's decathlon at the European Athletics Championships

The men's decathlon at the 2010 European Athletics Championships was held at the Estadi Olímpic Lluís Companys on 28 and 29 July.

== Medalists ==
Gold	Romain Barras; France (FRA)
Silver	Eelco Sintnicolaas; Netherlands (NED)
Bronze	Andrei Krauchanka; Belarus (BLR)

== Records ==
Standing records prior to the 2010 European Athletics Championships
World record	Roman Šebrle (CZE)	9026	Götzis, Austria	27 May 2001
European record	Roman Šebrle (CZE)	9026	Götzis, Austria	27 May 2001
Championship record	Daley Thompson (GBR)	8811	Stuttgart, West Germany	28 August 1986
World Leading	Bryan Clay (USA)	8483	Götzis, Austria	30 May 2010
European Leading	Oleksiy Kasyanov (UKR)	8381	Kladno, Czech Republic	16 June 2010
Broken records during the 2010 European Athletics Championships
European Leading	Romain Barras (FRA)	8453	Barcelona, Spain	29 July 2010

== Schedule ==
Date	Time	Round
28 July 2010	10:00	100 metres
28 July 2010	11:00	Long jump
28 July 2010	12:30	Shot put
28 July 2010	18:00	High jump
28 July 2010	21:55	400 metres
29 July 2010	10:05	110 metres hurdles
29 July 2010	11:00	Discus throw
29 July 2010	14:15	Pole vault
29 July 2010	17:30	Javelin throw
29 July 2010	21:10	1500 metres
29 July 2010		Final standings

== Results ==
=== 100 metres ===
==== Heat 1 ====
Rank	Lane	Name	Nationality	React	Time	Notes	Points
1	8	Igor Šarčević	Serbia	0.184	10.98	PB	865
2	2	Florian Geffrouais	France	0.178	11.09	PB	841
3	7	Nicklas Wiberg	Sweden	0.243	11.19		819
4	9	Roland Schwarzl	Austria		11.23	=SB	810
5	1	Marcin Dróżdż	Poland	0.174	11.31		793
6	3	Vasiliy Kharlamov	Russia	0.174	11.39		776
7	4	Agustín Félix	Spain	0.147	11.41		771
8	5	Lars Vikan Rise	Norway	0.157	11.46		761
9	6	Atis Vaisjūns	Latvia	0.148	11.55		742
				Wind: +0.1 m/s			

==== Heat 2 ====
Rank	Lane	Name	Nationality	React	Time	Notes	Points
1	6	Mikko Halvari	Finland	0.167	10.98	SB	865
2	7	Daniel Almgren	Sweden	0.210	11.14		830
3	2	Nadir El Fassi	France	0.211	11.16		825
4	4	Aleksey Drozdov	Russia	0.156	11.16	=SB	825
5	1	Yevhen Nikitin	Ukraine	0.179	11.17		823
6	8	Mikk Pahapill	Estonia	0.177	11.18		821
7	9	Hans van Alphen	Belgium	0.120	11.20		817
8	5	Simon Walter	Switzerland	0.215	11.25		806
9	3	Andrei Krauchanka	Belarus	0.181	11.26		804
				Wind: +0.8 m/s			

==== Heat 3 ====
Rank	Lane	Name	Nationality	React	Time	Notes	Points
1	7	Oleksiy Kasyanov	Ukraine	0.162	10.60	SB	952
2	2	Darius Draudvila	Lithuania	0.178	10.71	PB	926
3	6	Eelco Sintnicolaas	Netherlands	0.223	10.71	PB	926
4	3	Mihail Dudaš	Serbia	0.130	10.82		901
5	1	Eduard Mikhan	Belarus	0.167	10.84	SB	897
6	5	Ingmar Vos	Netherlands	0.166	10.95		872
7	4	Andres Raja	Estonia	0.169	11.00		861
8	9	Romain Barras	France	0.206	11.09		841
9	8	Mikk-Mihkel Arro	Estonia	0.238	11.19		819
				Wind: -0.6 m/s			

=== Long jump ===
Rank	Athlete	Nationality	#1	#2	#3	Result	Notes	Points
1	Oleksiy Kasyanov	Ukraine	7.88	x	x	7.88		1030
2	Andrei Krauchanka	Belarus	7.56	7.76	x	7.76	SB	1000
3	Roland Schwarzl	Austria	x	7.49	7.68	7.68	PB	980
4	Mikk Pahapill	Estonia	7.41	x	7.67	7.67	SB	977
5	Ingmar Vos	Netherlands	7.19	7.18	7.56	7.56	PB	950
6	Eelco Sintnicolaas	Netherlands	7.18	7.42	7.54	7.54	SB	945
7	Darius Draudvila	Lithuania	7.52	7.48	7.41	7.52	PB	940
8	Eduard Mikhan	Belarus	7.47	7.29	7.39	7.47	SB	927
9	Mihail Dudaš	Serbia	7.29	7.46	7.36	7.46		925
10	Nadir El Fassi	France	7.42			7.42	SB	915
11	Andres Raja	Estonia	7.00	7.32	7.38	7.38		905
12	Igor Šarčević	Serbia	7.15	7.36	7.27	7.36	PB	900
13	Aleksey Drozdov	Russia	x	7.23	7.35	7.35	SB	898
14	Nicklas Wiberg	Sweden	7.29	7.16	7.21	7.29		883
14	Daniel Almgren	Sweden	7.29	6.82	x	7.29	SB	883
16	Vasiliy Kharlamov	Russia	7.03	7.26	7.28	7.28		881
17	Hans van Alphen	Belgium	7.22	7.26	7.25	7.26	SB	876
18	Romain Barras	France	x	7.24	x	7.24	SB	871
19	Agustín Félix	Spain	7.21	7.17	x	7.21		864
19	Mikk-Mihkel Arro	Estonia	x	7.21	x	7.21		864
21	Mikko Halvari	Finland	7.19	7.13	x	7.19	SB	859
22	Simon Walter	Switzerland	6.96	7.05	x	7.05		826
23	Lars Vikan Rise	Norway	6.81	7.03	7.00	7.03		821
24	Atis Vaisjūns	Latvia	x	6.90	x	6.90		790
25	Florian Geffrouais	France	5.08	x	6.88	6.88		785
26	Marcin Dróżdż	Poland	6.85	6.72	6.70	6.85		778
27	Yevhen Nikitin	Ukraine	x	6.54	6.75	6.75		755

=== Shot put ===
Rank	Athlete	Nationality	#1	#2	#3	Result	Notes	Points
1	Aleksey Drozdov	Russia	15.89	14.89	x	15.89		844
2	Lars Vikan Rise	Norway	14.93	15.46	x	15.46		818
3	Romain Barras	France	14.69	15.15	15.05	15.15		799
4	Hans van Alphen	Belgium	15.08	14.92	x	15.08	SB	795
4	Darius Draudvila	Lithuania	13.96	14.88	15.08	15.08	PB	795
6	Mikk Pahapill	Estonia	14.19	13.82	14.93	14.93		785
7	Nicklas Wiberg	Sweden	14.86	14.51	14.38	14.86		781
8	Atis Vaisjūns	Latvia	14.76	14.40	x	14.76		775
9	Vasiliy Kharlamov	Russia	x	14.67	14.65	14.67		769
10	Mikko Halvari	Finland	x	13.57	14.53	14.53		761
11	Andrei Krauchanka	Belarus	13.31	14.14	14.32	14.32		748
12	Oleksiy Kasyanov	Ukraine	13.08	14.27	13.70	14.27		745
13	Daniel Almgren	Sweden	13.90	14.18	x	14.18	PB	739
14	Roland Schwarzl	Austria	x	14.16	13.99	14.16		738
15	Ingmar Vos	Netherlands	13.99	14.06	x	14.06		732
16	Marcin Dróżdż	Poland	13.59	14.02	x	14.02	SB	730
17	Yevhen Nikitin	Ukraine	13.98	13.81	13.74	13.98		727
18	Igor Šarčević	Serbia	13.07	13.96	13.23	13.96		726
19	Andres Raja	Estonia	x	13.90	x	13.90		722
20	Mikk-Mihkel Arro	Estonia	13.75	x	13.79	13.79		715
20	Nadir El Fassi	France	13.56	13.79	x	13.79		715
22	Mihail Dudas	Serbia	13.53	x	x	13.53	PB	700
23	Agustín Félix	Spain	11.95	12.62	13.42	13.42		693
24	Eduard Mikhan	Belarus	13.30	13.34	13.21	13.34		688
25	Eelco Sintnicolaas	Netherlands	12.92	12.18	13.12	13.12		675
26	Simon Walter	Switzerland	12.99	12.24	12.16	12.99		667
27	Florian Geffrouais	France	x	11.26	x	11.26		562

=== High jump ===
Rank	Athlete	Nationality	Result	Points	Notes
1	Aleksey Drozdov	Russia	2.07	868	
2	Andrei Krauchanka	Belarus	2.07	868	SB
3	Mikk Pahapill	Estonia	2.07	868	=SB
4	Darius Draudvila	Lithuania	2.04	840	SB
5	Nicklas Wiberg	Sweden	2.04	840	
6	Romain Barras	France	2.04	840	=PB
7	Marcin Dróżdż	Poland	2.04	840	
8	Andres Raja	Estonia	2.04	840	
8	Oleksiy Kasyanov	Ukraine	2.04	840	SB
10	Simon Walter	Switzerland	2.01	813	=PB
11	Mihail Dudaš	Serbia	2.01	813	SB
12	Ingmar Vos	Netherlands	2.01	813	SB
13	Igor Šarčević	Serbia	2.01	813	=PB
14	Atis Vaisjūns	Latvia	1.98	785	
15	Lars Vikan Rise	Norway	1.95	758	SB
16	Eelco Sintnicolaas	Netherlands	1.95	758	
17	Eduard Mikhan	Belarus	1.92	731	
18	Vasiliy Kharlamov	Russia	1.92	731	
18	Agustín Félix	Spain	1.92	731	
20	Mikko Halvari	Finland	1.89	705	SB
20	Daniel Almgren	Sweden	1.89	705	
20	Nadir El Fassi	France	1.89	705	
23	Hans van Alphen	Belgium	1.89	705	
24	Roland Schwarzl	Austria	1.86	679	
25	Mikk-Mihkel Arro	Estonia	1.86	679	
26	Florian Geffrouais	France	1.86	679	
	Yevhen Nikitin	Ukraine			DNS

=== 400 metres ===
==== Heat 1 ====
Rank	Lane	Name	Nationality	React	Time	Notes	Points
1	2	Nicklas Wiberg	Sweden	0.261	48.74		874
2	5	Nadir El Fassi	France	0.306	50.20		805
3	3	Aleksey Drozdov	Russia	0.227	50.88	SB	774
4	6	Marcin Dróżdż	Poland	0.186	51.26		757
5	7	Atis Vaisjūns	Latvia	0.159	51.86		731
6	4	Agustín Félix	Spain	0.209	52.29	SB	712

==== Heat 2 ====
Rank	Lane	Name	Nationality	React	Time	Notes	Points
1	6	Vasiliy Kharlamov	Russia	0.192	49.38	SB	843
2	7	Mikko Halvari	Finland	0.200	49.79	PB	824
3	5	Mikk Pahapill	Estonia	0.202	50.13	SB	809
4	4	Roland Schwarzl	Austria	0.187	50.16	SB	807
5	2	Lars Vikan Rise	Norway	0.161	50.47		793
6	3	Ingmar Vos	Netherlands	0.228	50.64	SB	785
7	8	Mikk-Mihkel Arro	Estonia	0.249	51.58		743

==== Heat 3 ====
Rank	Lane	Name	Nationality	React	Time	Notes	Points
1	4	Daniel Almgren	Sweden	0.211	48.34	SB	893
2	2	Andrei Krauchanka	Belarus	0.215	49.01	SB	861
3	8	Andres Raja	Estonia	0.163	49.12	SB	856
4	5	Florian Geffrouais	France	0.216	49.15	PB	854
5	7	Hans van Alphen	Belgium	0.175	49.44	SB	841
6	3	Igor Šarčević	Serbia	0.263	49.64	PB	831
–	6	Yevhen Nikitin	Ukraine			DNS	

==== Heat 4 ====
Rank	Lane	Name	Nationality	React	Time	Notes	Points
1	7	Eelco Sintnicolaas	Netherlands	0.212	47.88	PB	915
2	6	Mihail Dudaš	Serbia	0.260	47.92	SB	913
3	2	Eduard Mikhan	Belarus	0.214	48.09	PB	905
4	4	Romain Barras	France	0.199	48.33	SB	893
5	5	Darius Draudvila	Lithuania	0.133	48.43	PB	888
6	3	Simon Walter	Switzerland	0.192	49.19		852
7	8	Oleksiy Kasyanov	Ukraine	0.181	49.41		842

=== 110 metres hurdles ===
==== Heat 1 ====
Rank	Lane	Name	Nationality	Time	Notes	Points
1	3	Vasiliy Kharlamov	Russia	14.95	SB	856
2	5	Florian Geffrouais	France	14.97	PB	853
3	6	Mihail Dudaš	Serbia	15.06	SB	842
4	2	Agustín Félix	Spain	15.09	SB	839
5	1	Atis Vaisjūns	Latvia	15.17		829
6	7	Marcin Dróżdż	Poland	15.18	SB	828
7	8	Daniel Almgren	Sweden	15.29	SB	815
8	4	Lars Vikan Rise	Norway	15.66		772

==== Heat 2 ====
Rank	Lane	Name	Nationality	Time	Notes	Points
1	3	Darius Draudvila	Lithuania	14.29	PB	937
2	6	Ingmar Vos	Netherlands	14.63	SB	895
3	5	Nadir El Fassi	France	14.65		892
4	9	Hans van Alphen	Belgium	14.89	SB	863
5	4	Mikk-Mihkel Arro	Estonia	14.91		860
6	7	Mikko Halvari	Finland	15.26		818
7	8	Simon Walter	Switzerland	15.27		817
8	2	Aleksey Drozdov	Russia	15.63		775
-	1	Nicklas Wiberg	Sweden	-	DNS	-

==== Heat 3 ====
Rank	Lane	Name	Nationality	Time	Notes	Points
1	5	Andres Raja	Estonia	14.20		949
2	3	Andrei Krauchanka	Belarus	14.21		948
3	4	Romain Barras	France	14.22		946
4	2	Igor Šarčević	Serbia	14.23	PB	945
5	7	Eelco Sintnicolaas	Netherlands	14.33	PB	932
6	8	Eduard Mikhan	Belarus	14.37	PB	927
7	6	Mikk Pahapill	Estonia	14.38		926
8	1	Roland Schwarzl	Austria	14.70		886
-	9	Oleksiy Kasyanov	Ukraine	-	DNS	-

=== Discus throw ===
Rank	Athlete	Nationality	#1	#2	#3	Result	Notes	Points
1	Mikko Halvari	Finland	44.29	49.72	52.06	52.06	CB	913
2	Hans van Alphen	Belgium	46.66	47.67	x	47.67	PB	822
3	Mikk Pahapill	Estonia	44.08	46.02	46.79	46.79		804
4	Vasiliy Kharlamov	Russia	45.68	46.60	46.74	46.74		803
5	Marcin Dróżdż	Poland	45.54	43.45	x	45.54	SB	778
6	Andrei Krauchanka	Belarus	40.64	38.53	45.48	45.48	SB	777
7	Atis Vaisjūns	Latvia	42.16	45.46	43.87	45.46	PB	776
8	Eduard Mikhan	Belarus	45.04	44.31	x	45.04	PB	768
9	Darius Draudvila	Lithuania	44.53	42.68	x	44.53		757
10	Romain Barras	France	x	44.10	44.51	44.51		757
11	Aleksey Drozdov	Russia	36.63	44.39	x	44.39		754
12	Roland Schwarzl	Austria	41.66	x	44.22	44.22		751
13	Eelco Sintnicolaas	Netherlands	x	42.43	x	42.43	PB	714
14	Florian Geffrouais	France	34.96	31.86	42.28	42.28		711
15	Agustín Félix	Spain	35.35	39.88	41.93	41.93	SB	704
16	Mihail Dudaš	Serbia	39.64	x	41.90	41.90		703
17	Ingmar Vos	Netherlands	38.90	41.76	x	41.76	SB	700
18	Nadir El Fassi	France	35.09	41.53	39.75	41.53		696
19	Simon Walter	Switzerland	36.08	39.30	39.86	39.86		662
20	Igor Šarčević	Serbia	39.69	x	–	39.69		658
21	Andres Raja	Estonia	x	38.41	39.64	39.64		657
22	Mikk-Mihkel Arro	Estonia	x	39.00	x	39.00		644
23	Lars Vikan Rise	Norway	31.80	33.76	38.03	38.03		625
24	Daniel Almgren	Sweden	35.68	37.51	x	37.51		614
–	Oleksiy Kasyanov	Ukraine						DNS
–	Nicklas Wiberg	Sweden						DNS

=== Pole vault ===
Rank	Athlete	Nationality	Result	Points	Notes
1	Eelco Sintnicolaas	Netherlands	5.45	1051	CB, PB
2	Romain Barras	France	5.05	926	=PB
2	Igor Šarčević	Serbia	5.05	926	
4	Roland Schwarzl	Austria	5.05	926	
5	Andrei Krauchanka	Belarus	5.05	926	SB
6	Mikk Pahapill	Estonia	4.95	895	SB
7	Agustín Félix	Spain	4.95	895	SB
8	Nadir El Fassi	France	4.95	895	PB
9	Aleksey Drozdov	Russia	4.85	865	SB
10	Marcin Dróżdż	Poland	4.85	865	
11	Atis Vaisjūns	Latvia	4.75	834	
12	Florian Geffrouais	France	4.75	834	PB
13	Hans van Alphen	Belgium	4.75	834	PB
14	Vasiliy Kharlamov	Russia	4.65	804	
15	Eduard Mikhan	Belarus	4.65	804	PB
16	Darius Draudvila	Lithuania	4.55	775	SB
17	Ingmar Vos	Netherlands	4.55	775	PB
18	Andres Raja	Estonia	4.55	775	
19	Lars Vikan Rise	Norway	4.45	746	
20	Daniel Almgren	Sweden	4.35	716	PB
20	Mihail Dudaš	Serbia	4.35	716	
22	Mikko Halvari	Finland	4.25	688	
—	Mikk-Mihkel Arro	Estonia	NM	0	
—	Oleksiy Kasyanov	Ukraine	DNS		
—	Nicklas Wiberg	Sweden	DNS		
—	Simon Walter	Switzerland	DNS		

=== Javelin throw ===
Rank	Athlete	Nationality	#1	#2	#3	Result	Points	Notes
1	Lars Vikan Rise	Norway	60.32	63.53	71.71	71.71	915	PB
2	Romain Barras	France	65.77	x	61.79	65.77	825	SB
3	Florian Geffrouais	France	x	61.99	63.76	63.76	795	PB
4	Eelco Sintnicolaas	Netherlands	56.58	54.63	62.57	62.57	777	PB
5	Ingmar Vos	Netherlands	55.69	61.66	x	61.66	763	
6	Aleksey Drozdov	Russia	58.53	60.74	x	60.74	749	
7	Andres Raja	Estonia	58.77	59.34	x	59.34	728	SB
8	Mikk Pahapill	Estonia	59.16	58.73	59.23	59.23	726	
8	Atis Vaisjūns	Latvia	x	58.26	59.23	59.23	726	
10	Marcin Dróżdż	Poland	53.41	54.64	58.79	58.79	720	SB
11	Hans van Alphen	Belgium	57.77	56.19	58.47	58.47	715	
12	Andrei Krauchanka	Belarus	58.05	56.84	57.66	58.05	709	
13	Vasiliy Kharlamov	Russia	56.05	57.94	x	57.94	707	
14	Agustín Félix	Spain	52.47	56.92	57.68	57.68	703	SB
15	Igor Šarčević	Serbia	53.79	55.23	x	55.23	666	
16	Daniel Almgren	Sweden	53.76	x	53.95	53.95	647	
17	Eduard Mikhan	Belarus	52.61	x	53.39	53.39	639	SB
18	Nadir El Fassi	France	50.83	51.49	52.68	52.68	628	
19	Darius Draudvila	Lithuania	52.35	52.59	51.86	52.59	627	
20	Mikko Halvari	Finland	50.38	x	-	50.38	594	
21	Roland Schwarzl	Austria	48.84	49.86	x	49.86	587	
-	Mihail Dudaš	Serbia						DNS
-	Simon Walter	Switzerland						DNS
-	Mikk-Mihkel Arro	Estonia						DNS

=== 1500 metres ===
==== Heat 1 ====
Rank	Lane	Name	Nationality	Time	Points	Notes
1	7	Nadir El Fassi	France	4:17.25	830	SB
2	1	Daniel Almgren	Sweden	4:18.64	821	
3	5	Florian Geffrouais	France	4:22.88	792	PB
4	2	Lars Vikan Rise	Norway	4:36.04	705	
5	3	Vasiliy Kharlamov	Russia	4:40.96	674	
6	10	Roland Schwarzl	Austria	4:58.69	567	
7	9	Agustín Félix	Spain	5:01.61	550	
8	8	Marcin Dróżdż	Poland	5:01.97	548	
9	6	Atis Vaisjūns	Latvia	5:04.22	536	
10	4	Mikko Halvari	Finland	5:18.86	456	

==== Heat 2 ====
Rank	Lane	Name	Nationality	Time	Points	Notes
1	6	Hans van Alphen	Belgium	4:21.06	804	SB
2	11	Romain Barras	France	4:28.43	755	
3	9	Eelco Sintnicolaas	Netherlands	4:30.31	743	
4	5	Eduard Mikhan	Belarus	4:34.90	713	
5	1	Andrei Krauchanka	Belarus	4:36.66	701	SB
6	10	Andres Raja	Estonia	4:37.13	698	PB
7	2	Ingmar Vos	Netherlands	4:37.50	696	
8	3	Mikk Pahapill	Estonia	4:38.99	687	
9	7	Aleksey Drozdov	Russia	4:40.46	677	SB
10	8	Igor Šarčević	Serbia	4:42.41	665	SB
11	4	Darius Draudvila	Lithuania	5:02.17	547	

=== Final standings ===
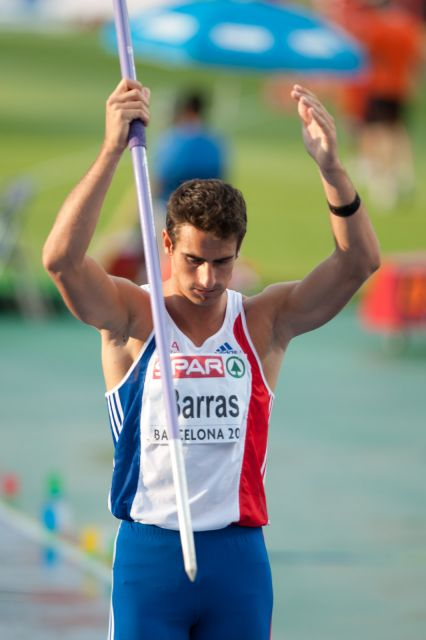
Frenchman Romain Barras took the title – his first medal at European level.

Place	Athlete	Nation	Points	Notes
1st place, gold medalist(s)	Romain Barras	France	8453	EL
2nd place, silver medalist(s)	Eelco Sintnicolaas	Netherlands	8436	PB
3rd place, bronze medalist(s)	Andrei Krauchanka	Belarus	8370	SB
4	Mikk Pahapill	Estonia	8298	PB
5	Hans van Alphen	Belgium	8072	PB
6	Darius Draudvila	Lithuania	8032	PB
7	Aleksey Drozdov	Russia	8029	
8	Eduard Mikhan	Belarus	7999	=PB
9	Igor Šarčević	Serbia	7995	PB
10	Andres Raja	Estonia	7991	
11	Ingmar Vos	Netherlands	7981	SB
12	Nadir El Fassi	France	7906	
13	Vasiliy Kharlamov	Russia	7844	
14	Roland Schwarzl	Austria	7731	
15	Lars Vikan Rise	Norway	7714	SB
16	Florian Geffrouais	France	7706	
17	Daniel Almgren	Sweden	7663	
18	Marcin Dróżdż	Poland	7637	
19	Atis Vaisjūns	Latvia	7524	
20	Mikko Halvari	Finland	7483	
21	Agustín Félix	Spain	7462	SB
	Nicklas Wiberg	Sweden	DNF	
	Mihail Dudaš	Serbia	DNF	
	Simon Walter	Switzerland	DNF	
	Mikk-Mihkel Arro	Estonia	DNF	
	Oleksiy Kasyanov	Ukraine	DNF	
	Yevhen Nikitin	Ukraine	DNF	
