= Athletics at the 2009 Summer Universiade – Men's decathlon =

The men's decathlon competition at the 2009 Summer Universiade took place on 8 and 9 July 2009 in the Stadion Crvena Zvezda in Belgrade, Serbia.

== Medalists ==
Gold	Silver	Bronze
Mikalai Shubianok; Belarus	Brent Newdick; New Zealand	Attila Szabó; Hungary

== Records ==
World record	Roman Šebrle (CZE)	9026	27 May 2001	Götzis, Austria
Event record	Roman Šebrle (CZE)	8380	30 August 1997	Catania, Italy

== Results ==
=== 100 metres ===
Wind:
Heat 1: +0.5 m/s, Heat 2: -2.2 m/s

Rank	Heat	Name	Nationality	Time	Points	Notes
1	2	James Adjetey-Nelson	Canada	11.05	850	
2	2	Brent Newdick	New Zealand	11.07	845	
3	2	Attila Szabó	Hungary	11.10	838	
4	2	Moritz Cleve	Germany	11.13	832	
5	1	Tiago Marto	Portugal	11.28	799	
6	1	Bogdan Barcacila	Romania	11.31	793	
6	2	Lars Albert	Germany	11.31	793	
8	1	Igor Šarčević	Serbia	11.33	789	
9	1	Mikalai Shubianok	Belarus	11.52	748	
9	2	Slobodan Matijević	Serbia	11.52	748	
11	1	Ali Hazer	Lebanon	11.56	740	
12	1	Philipp Britner	Russia	11.57	738	
13	2	Aleksandr Grishin	Russia	11.58	736	
	1	Jangy Addy	Liberia	DNS	0	

=== Long jump ===
Rank	Group	Athlete	Nationality	#1	#2	#3	Result	Points	Notes	Overall
1	B	Mikalai Shubianok	Belarus	7.15	7.20	x	7.20	862		1610
2	B	Brent Newdick	New Zealand	x	7.15	7.18	7.18	857		1702
3	A	Philipp Britner	Russia	6.96	x	7.17	7.17	854		1592
4	B	Lars Albert	Germany	6.75	6.90	7.05	7.05	826		1619
5	A	Tiago Marto	Portugal	6.79	6.96	6.87	6.96	804		1603
6	A	Moritz Cleve	Germany	6.95	6.65	6.77	6.95	802		1634
7	B	Igor Šarčević	Serbia	6.43	x	6.93	6.93	797		1586
8	B	Attila Szabó	Hungary	6.91	x	6.84	6.91	792		1630
9	A	Bogdan Barcacila	Romania	6.83	6.81	6.82	6.83	774		1567
10	A	Aleksandr Grishin	Russia	6.39	6.74	6.58	6.74	753		1489
11	B	James Adjetey-Nelson	Canada	6.32	6.71	x	6.71	746		1596
12	A	Slobodan Matijević	Serbia	6.48	6.65	6.61	6.65	732		1480
	A	Ali Hazer	Lebanon				DNS	0		DNF

=== Shot put ===
Rank	Group	Athlete	Nationality	#1	#2	#3	Result	Points	Notes	Overall
1	B	Lars Albert	Germany	14.94	15.53	x	15.53	822		2441
2	B	Attila Szabó	Hungary	13.38	14.65	14.17	14.65	768		2398
3	A	Mikalai Shubianok	Belarus	13.70	14.31	14.15	14.31	747		2357
4	A	Aleksandr Grishin	Russia	13.52	13.36	13.96	13.96	726		2215
5	A	Brent Newdick	New Zealand	13.90	13.45	x	13.90	722		2424
6	A	Igor Šarčević	Serbia	13.05	x	13.83	13.83	718		2304
7	B	Philipp Britner	Russia	x	13.70	13.82	13.82	717		2309
8	B	James Adjetey-Nelson	Canada	12.90	13.28	13.56	13.56	701		2297
9	B	Moritz Cleve	Germany	13.21	13.45	13.31	13.45	695		2329
10	A	Slobodan Matijević	Serbia	11.52	x	13.11	13.11	674		2154
11	A	Tiago Marto	Portugal	12.57	12.38	12.59	12.59	642		2245
12	B	Bogdan Barcacila	Romania	x	x	11.52	11.52	577		2144

=== High jump ===
Rank	Group	Athlete	Nationality	1.77	1.80	1.83	1.86	1.89	1.92	1.95	1.98	2.01	2.04	2.07	2.10	2.13	2.16	Result	Points	Notes	Overall
1	A	Philipp Britner	Russia	–	–	–	–	–	o	–	o	–	o	o	o	o	xxx	2.13	925	SB	3234
2	A	Mikalai Shubianok	Belarus	–	–	–	o	–	o	o	xo	o	xxx					2.01	813		3170
3	A	Aleksandr Grishin	Russia	–	–	–	–	o	xo	xo	xo	xxx						1.98	785		3000
3	B	Tiago Marto	Portugal	o	o	o	o	o	o	xxo	xo	xxx						1.98	785		3030
3	B	Slobodan Matijević	Serbia	–	–	xo	o	xo	o	o	xo	xxx						1.98	785	SB	2939
6	A	Brent Newdick	New Zealand	–	–	–	o	–	o	o	xxx							1.95	758		3182
7	A	James Adjetey-Nelson	Canada	–	–	–	o	–	o	xxo	xxx							1.95	758		3055
8	B	Igor Šarčević	Serbia	–	–	o	–	o	o	xxx								1.92	731	SB	3035
9	B	Attila Szabó	Hungary	–	o	o	o	xo	xxo	xxx								1.92	731		3129
10	A	Moritz Cleve	Germany	–	o	o	xo	xxo	xxx									1.89	705		3034
11	B	Lars Albert	Germany	–	o	o	o	xxx										1.86	679	SB	3120
12	B	Bogdan Barcacila	Romania	o	o	xo	xo	xxx										1.86	679		2823

=== 400 metres ===
Rank	Heat	Name	Nationality	Time	Points	Notes	Overall
1	2	Moritz Cleve	Germany	49.16	854		3888
2	2	Brent Newdick	New Zealand	49.63	832		4014
3	2	Bogdan Barcacila	Romania	49.68	829		3652
4	2	Mikalai Shubianok	Belarus	49.79	824		3994
5	1	James Adjetey-Nelson	Canada	49.80	824	SB	3879
6	2	Attila Szabó	Hungary	50.16	807		3936
7	2	Philipp Britner	Russia	50.52	791		4025
8	1	Igor Šarčević	Serbia	51.08	765		3800
9	1	Tiago Marto	Portugal	51.66	740	SB	3770
10	1	Lars Albert	Germany	52.03	723		3843
11	1	Slobodan Matijević	Serbia	52.21	716		3655
12	1	Aleksandr Grishin	Russia	52.53	702		3702

=== 110 metres hurdles ===
Wind:
Heat 1: +0.3 m/s, Heat 2: -0.7 m/s

Rank	Lane	Name	Nationality	Time	Points	Notes	Overall
1	1	Philipp Britner	Russia	14.33	932	SB	4957
2	1	Moritz Cleve	Germany	14.51	910		4798
3	1	Attila Szabó	Hungary	14.75	880		4816
4	1	Brent Newdick	New Zealand	14.78	876		4890
4	2	Mikalai Shubianok	Belarus	14.78	876		4870
6	2	Tiago Marto	Portugal	14.81	873		4643
7	1	James Adjetey-Nelson	Canada	15.05	843		4722
8	2	Lars Albert	Germany	15.09	839	SB	4682
8	2	Igor Šarčević	Serbia	15.29	815		4615
10	2	Bogdan Barcacila	Romania	15.69	768		4420
11	2	Aleksandr Grishin	Russia	16.07	725		4427
12	1	Slobodan Matijević	Serbia	18.76	454		4109

=== Discus throw ===
Rank	Athlete	Nationality	#1	#2	#3	Result	Points	Notes	Overall
1	Lars Albert	Germany	44.89	x	46.07	46.07	789		5471
2	Mikalai Shubianok	Belarus	42.45	42.69	44.06	44.06	748		5618
3	Attila Szabó	Hungary	34.75	44.06	x	44.06	748		5564
4	Brent Newdick	New Zealand	43.94	43.11	43.89	43.94	745		5635
5	James Adjetey-Nelson	Canada	43.28	x	41.57	43.28	732		5454
6	Tiago Marto	Portugal	40.21	36.58	x	40.21	669		5312
7	Aleksandr Grishin	Russia	39.95	x	37.46	39.95	664		5091
8	Moritz Cleve	Germany	37.51	39.44	38.97	39.44	653		5451
9	Bogdan Barcacila	Romania	36.47	35.16	35.25	36.47	593		5013
10	Slobodan Matijević	Serbia	32.47	x	x	32.47	513		4622
	Philipp Britner	Russia	x	x	x	NM	0		4957
	Igor Šarčević	Serbia				DNS	0		DNF

=== Pole vault ===
Rank	Athlete	Nationality	3.40	3.60	3.70	3.80	3.90	4.00	4.10	4.20	4.30	4.40	4.50	4.60	4.70	4.80	4.90	5.00	Result	Points	Notes	Overall
1	Lars Albert	Germany	–	–	–	–	–	–	–	–	–	–	–	xo	–	o	xo	xxx	4.90	880		6351
2	Brent Newdick	New Zealand	–	–	–	–	–	–	–	–	o	–	o	–	xo	xxx			4.70	819		6454
3	Aleksandr Grishin	Russia	–	–	–	–	–	–	–	o	o	xxo	o	o	xxx				4.60	790		5881
4	Mikalai Shubianok	Belarus	–	–	–	–	–	–	–	–	xo	xo	xo	o	xxx				4.60	790		6408
5	Moritz Cleve	Germany	–	–	–	–	–	–	–	o	xo	o	xxx						4.40	731		6182
6	Attila Szabó	Hungary	–	–	–	–	–	–	o	o	xo	xo	xxx						4.40	731		6295
7	Tiago Marto	Portugal	–	–	–	o	–	xo	xo	xo	o	xxx							4.30	702		6014
8	Slobodan Matijević	Serbia	–	–	–	o	–	o	o	xxx									4.10	645		5267
9	James Adjetey-Nelson	Canada	–	–	–	xo	–	o	–	xxx									4.00	617		6071
10	Bogdan Barcacila	Romania	o	o	xxo	xo	o	xxo	xxx										4.00	617		5630
	Philipp Britner	Russia																	DNS	0		DNF

=== Javelin throw ===
Rank	Athlete	Nationality	#1	#2	#3	Result	Points	Notes	Overall
1	Attila Szabó	Hungary	61.04	60.31	64.80	64.80	810		7105
2	Mikalai Shubianok	Belarus	57.28	64.31	x	64.31	803		7211
3	James Adjetey-Nelson	Canada	58.57	53.16	54.73	58.57	716		6787
4	Brent Newdick	New Zealand	57.91	–	–	57.91	706		7160
5	Moritz Cleve	Germany	50.93	57.26	x	57.26	697		6879
6	Tiago Marto	Portugal	56.65	x	53.10	56.65	688		6702
7	Lars Albert	Germany	54.86	54.13	54.88	54.88	661		7012
8	Aleksandr Grishin	Russia	46.89	51.61	x	51.61	612		6493
9	Slobodan Matijević	Serbia	x	x	51.40	51.40	609		5876
	Bogdan Barcacila	Romania	x	–	–	NM	0		5630

=== 1500 metres ===
Rank	Name	Nationality	Time	Points	Notes
1	Moritz Cleve	Germany	4:27.06	764	
2	Mikalai Shubianok	Belarus	4:29.26	749	
3	Brent Newdick	New Zealand	4:34.74	714	
4	Tiago Marto	Portugal	4:45.79	644	
5	Attila Szabó	Hungary	4:46.06	643	
6	Aleksandr Grishin	Russia	4:51.22	611	
7	James Adjetey-Nelson	Canada	4:54.56	591	
8	Lars Albert	Germany	5:06.03	526	
	Bogdan Barcacila	Romania	DNS	0	
	Slobodan Matijević	Serbia	DNS	0	

=== Final standings ===
The highest mark recorded in each event is highlighted in yellow

Rank	Athlete	Nationality	100m	LJ	SP	HJ	400m	110m H	DT	PV	JT	1500m	Points	Notes
1st place, gold medalist(s)	Mikalai Shubianok	Belarus	11.52	7.20	14.31	2.01	49.79	14.78	44.06	4.60	64.31	4:29.26	7960	
2nd place, silver medalist(s)	Brent Newdick	New Zealand	11.07	7.18	13.90	1.95	49.63	14.78	43.94	4.70	57.91	4:34.74	7874	PB
3rd place, bronze medalist(s)	Attila Szabó	Hungary	11.10	6.91	14.65	1.92	50.16	14.75	44.06	4.40	64.80	4:46.06	7748	PB
4	Moritz Cleve	Germany	11.13	6.95	13.45	1.89	49.16	14.51	39.44	4.40	57.26	4:27.06	7643	
5	Lars Albert	Germany	11.31	7.05	15.53	1.86	52.03	15.09	46.07	4.90	54.88	5:06.03	7538	
6	James Adjetey-Nelson	Canada	11.05	6.71	13.56	1.95	49.80	15.05	43.28	4.00	58.57	4:54.56	7378	
7	Tiago Marto	Portugal	11.28	6.96	12.59	1.98	51.66	14.81	40.21	4.30	56.65	4:45.79	7346	
8	Aleksandr Grishin	Russia	11.58	6.74	13.96	1.98	52.53	16.07	39.95	4.60	51.61	4:51.22	7104	
	Slobodan Matijević	Serbia	11.52	6.65	13.11	1.98	52.21	18.76	32.47	4.10	51.40	DNS	DNF	
	Bogdan Barcacila	Romania	11.31	6.83	11.52	1.86	49.68	15.69	36.47	4.00	NM	DNS	DNF	
	Philipp Britner	Russia	11.57	7.17	13.82	2.13	50.52	14.33	NM	DNS	–	–	DNF	
	Igor Šarčević	Serbia	11.33	6.93	13.83	1.92	51.08	15.29	DNS	–	–	–	DNF	
	Ali Hazer	Lebanon	11.56	DNS	–	–	–	–	–	–	–	–	DNF	
	Jangy Addy	Liberia	DNS	–	–	–	–	–	–	–	–	–	DNS	

== See also ==
- 2009 World Championships in Athletics – Men's decathlon
- 2009 Hypo-Meeting
- 2009 Decathlon Year Ranking
