= Athletics at the 2010 Commonwealth Games – Men's decathlon =

Men's decathlon at the Commonwealth Games

The Men's decathlon at the 2010 Commonwealth Games as part of the athletics programme was held at the Jawaharlal Nehru Stadium on Thursday 7 and Friday 8 October 2010.

== Records ==
World Record	9026	Roman Šebrle	CZE	Götzis, Austria	27 May 2001
Games Record	8663	Daley Thompson	ENG	Edinburgh, Scotland	1986

== Results ==
Rank	Name	100m	Long Jump	Shot Put	High Jump	400m	110m hurdles	Discus Throw	Pole Vault	Javelin Throw	1500m	Points
1st place, gold medalist(s)	Jamie Adjetey-Nelson (CAN)	10.87	7.37	15.00	2.02	49.61	14.76	45.21	4.70	61.32	4:52.23	8070
2nd place, silver medalist(s)	Brent Newdick (NZL)	11.07	7.42	13.98	1.96	49.86	14.79	43.50	4.80	56.94	4:41.33	7899
3rd place, bronze medalist(s)	Martin Brockman (ENG)	11.36	7.29	13.50	2.14	49.95	15.40	37.75	4.60	51.96	4:26.28	7712 (PB)
4	Ben Hazell (ENG)	11.37	6.98	14.30	1.93	50.26	14.92	48.01	4.40	53.41	4:30.91	7676 (SB)
5	Kevin Sempers (ENG)	11.08	6.86	12.72	2.05	49.36	14.79	39.08	4.60	61.46	5:04.93	7571 (PB)
6	Benjamin Gregory (WAL)	11.40	7.07	11.65	1.90	49.59	14.85	31.93	5.20	53.10	4:41.94	7383 (PB)
7	Adolphus Jones (SKN)	11.22	7.08	13.47	1.90	49.46	14.89	38.23	4.20	43.23	4:35.55	7258 (PB)
8	Bharatinder Singh (IND)	11.03	7.29	14.30	1.87	50.87	15.51	41.78	3.90	56.08	5:07.04	7225 (PB)
9	Tom Reynolds (NIR)	11.15	7.04	12.79	1.81	49.85	15.00	35.91	4.60	48.67	4:43.77	7210
10	Vinod Pulimootil (IND)	11.15	6.88	14.43	1.78	49.98	15.59	35.66	4.40	52.80	4:49.95	7130
11	Kurt Felix (GRN)	11.50	7.08	12.08	2.08	50.71	15.55	36.35	3.60	63.12	4:54.02	7121
12	Guillaume Thierry (MRI)	11.59	6.47	13.42	1.84	51.90	15.52	41.22	4.20	55.39	5:02.11	6875
–	Claston Bernard (JAM)	11.13	6.91	14.90	2.08	54.63	14.73	42.12	NM	NM	DNS	DNF
–	Roger Skedd (SCO)	11.48	5.90	13.38	1.87	51.47	DNF	39.24	DNS	–	–	DNF
