= Jamie Adjetey-Nelson =

Canadian decathlete (born 1984)

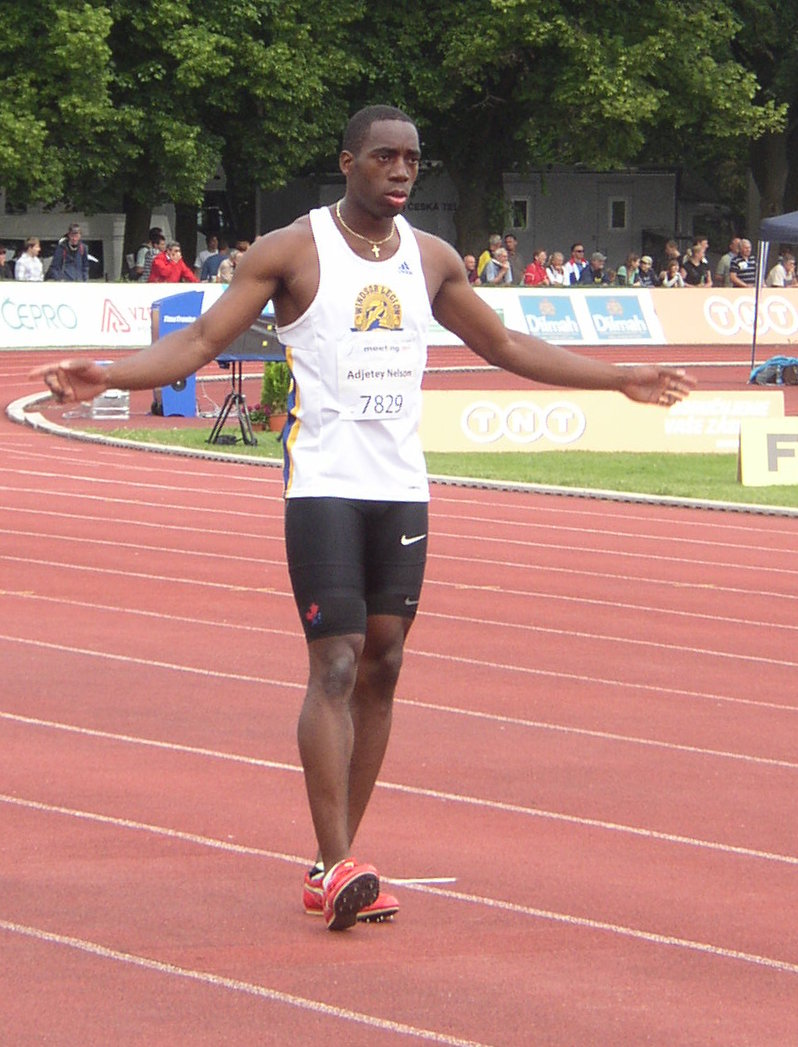
- Jamie Adjetey-Nelson at the 2010 TNT - Fortuna Meeting in Kladno

Personal information
- Full name: Jamie Nathaniel Adjetey-Nelson
- Nationality: Canadian
- Born: May 20, 1984 (age 42) Scarborough, Ontario
- Height: 1.90 m (6 ft 3 in)
- Weight: 86 kg (190 lb)

Sport
- Sport: Athletics
- Event: Decathlon
Medal record
Men's athletics
Representing Canada
Commonwealth Games
Gold medal – first place	2010 Delhi	Decathlon

Jamie Adjetey-Nelson (born May 20, 1984) is a Canadian athlete who competes in the decathlon. He grew up in Windsor, Ontario and was a part of their track and field team, the University of Windsor Athletics club, and the University of Windsor track and field team. Adjetey-Nelson won gold in the decathlon at the 2010 Commonwealth Games.

== Competition record ==
Year	Competition	Venue	Position	Event	Notes
Representing Canada
2003	Pan American Junior Championships	Bridgetown, Barbados	3rd	4 × 100 m relay	41.74
2004	NACAC U23 Championships	Sherbrooke, Canada	3rd	Decathlon	6733 pts
2007	Universiade	Bangkok, Thailand	9th	Decathlon	7517 pts
2009	Universiade	Belgrade, Serbia	6th	Decathlon	7378 pts
2009	Jeux de la Francophonie	Beirut, Lebanon	3rd	Decathlon	7602 pts
2010	Commonwealth Games	Delhi, India	1st	Decathlon	8070 pts
2011	World Championships	Daegu, South Korea	–	Decathlon	DNF
