= Igor Šarčević =

Serbian bobsledder and decathlete

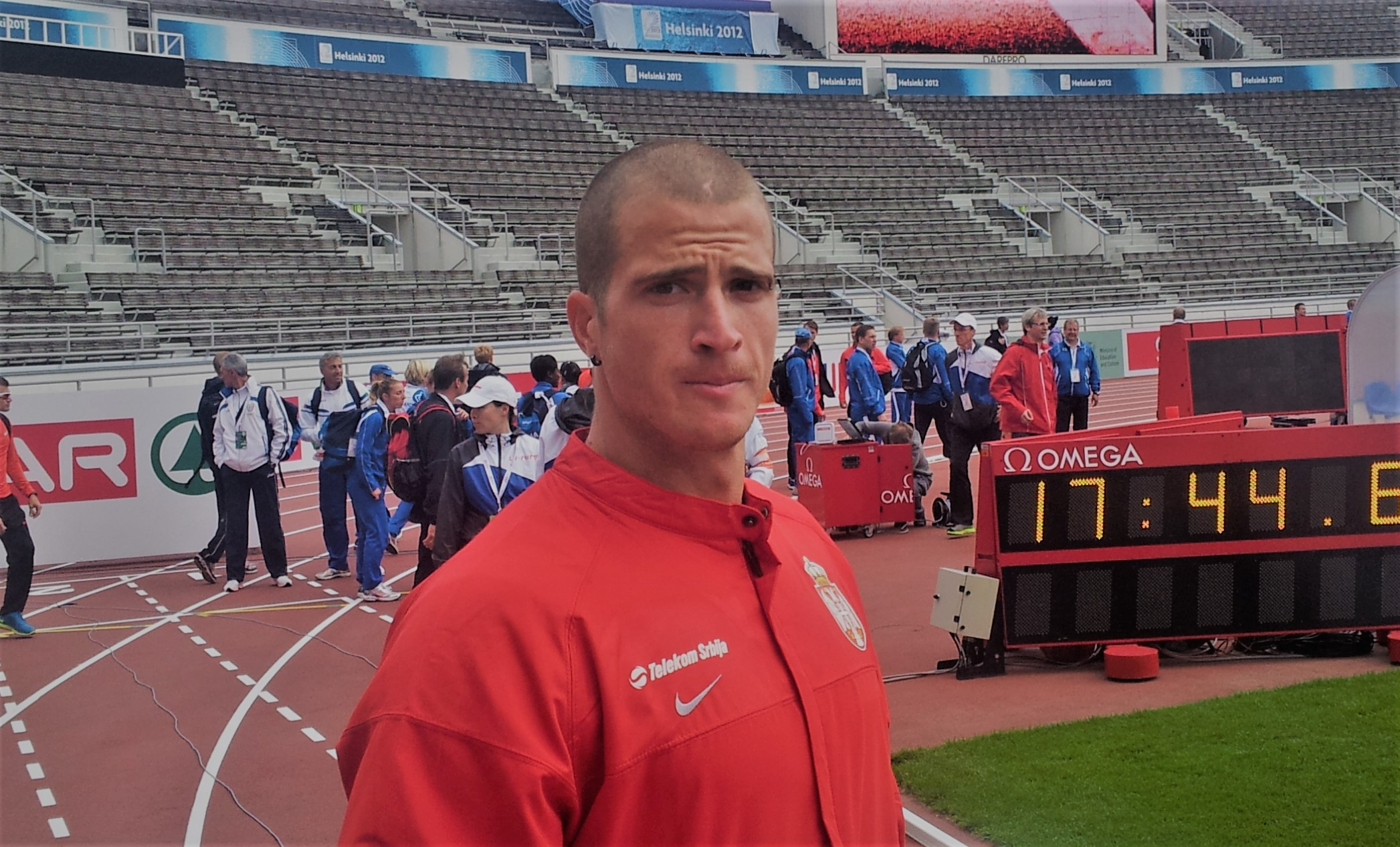

Personal information
- Nationality: Serbian
- Born: 25 August 1984 (age 41) Novi Sad, SR Serbia, Yugoslavia
- Height: 1.91 m (6 ft 3 in)
- Weight: 88.0 kg (194.0 lb; 13.86 st)

Sport
- Sport: Track and field; Bobsleigh

Achievements and titles
- Personal bests: Decathlon: 7995; Heptathlon: 5491

Igor Šarčević (Serbian Cyrillic: Игор Шарчевић, Serbian pronunciation: [îɡor ʃǎːrtʃeʋitɕ]; born 25 August 1984) is a Serbian decathlete and bobsledder who has competed since 2008.

Šarcević finished 18th in the four-man event at the 2010 Winter Olympics in Vancouver. At the FIBT World Championships 2009 in Lake Placid, New York, He finished 32nd in the two-man event while crashing out in the four-man event.

Šarcević improved his personal best in decathlon to 7995 points for 9th place at the 2010 European Athletics Championships.

== Achievements ==
=== Track and field ===
Year	Competition	Venue	Position	Event	Notes
Representing Serbia
2007	Universiade	Bangkok, Thailand	DNF	Decathlon	-
2009	Universiade	Belgrade, Serbia	DNF	Decathlon	-
2010	European Championships	Barcelona, Spain	9th	Decathlon	7995
2012	European Championships	Helsinki, Finland	DNF	Decathlon	-

=== Bobsleigh ===
Year	Competition	Venue	Partners	Position	Event	Time
Representing Serbia
2009	World Championships	Lake Placid, New York, USA	Vuk Rađenović	32nd	Two-man	2:53.95
2010	Olympic Games	Vancouver, Canada	Vuk Rađenović; Miloš Savić; Slobodan Matijević	18th	Four-man	3:30.35
