= Mikk-Mihkel Arro =

Estonian decathlete

Personal information
- Full name: Mikk-Mihkel Arro
- Born: 28 March 1984 (age 42) Paide, then part of Estonian SSR, Soviet Union

Sport
- Event: Decathlon
- Personal best: Decathlon 7808 (2010)
- Updated on 18 February 2011

Mikk-Mihkel Arro (born 28 March 1984) is an Estonian decathlete.

== Achievements ==
Year	Tournament	Venue	Points	Rank	Event
2009	World Championships	Berlin, Germany	7528	33	Decathlon
2010	European Championships	Barcelona, Spain	DNF	—	Decathlon
