= 2011 TNT – Fortuna Meeting =

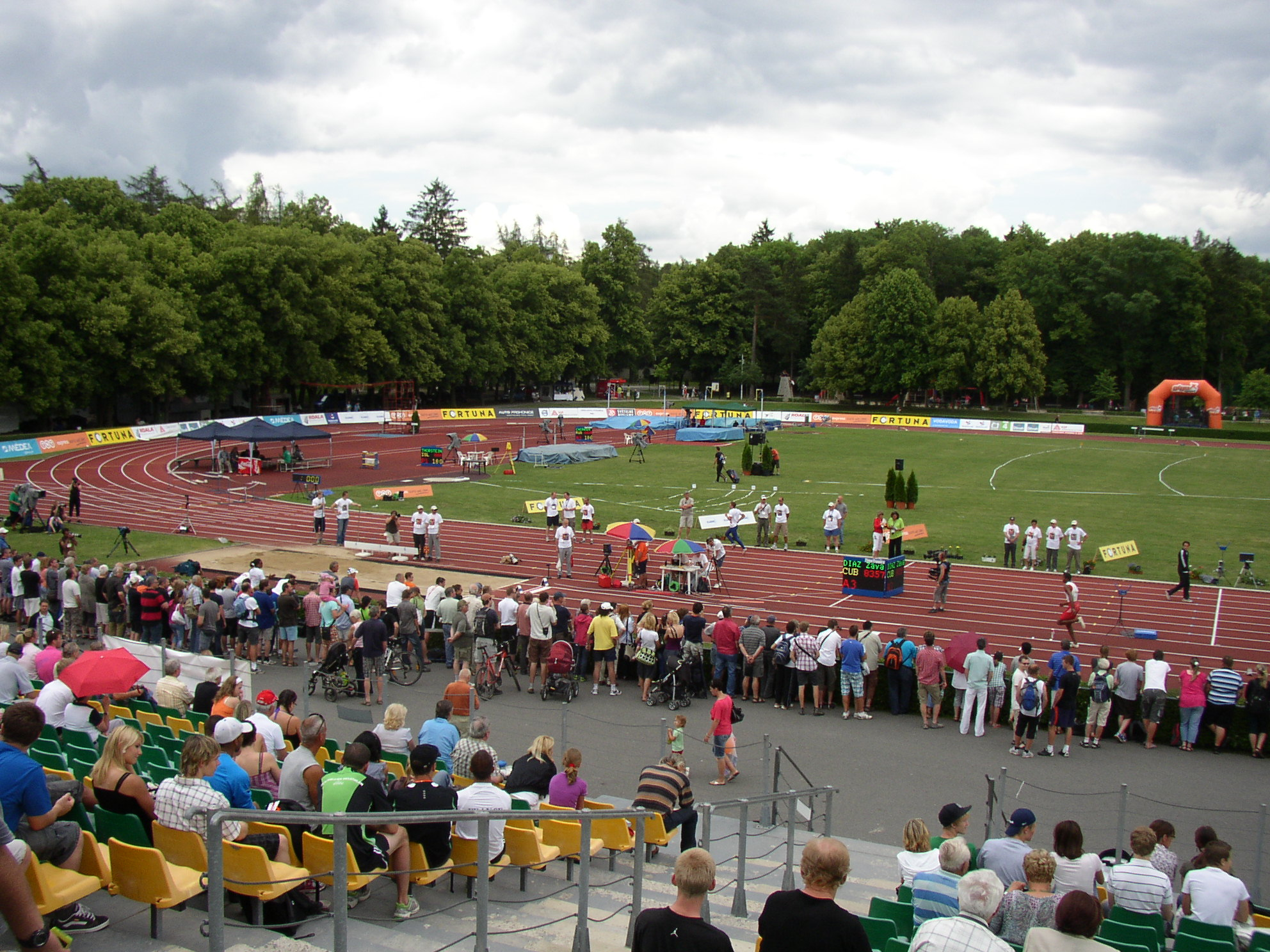
Long jump in men's decathlon (Sletiště Stadium, June 15, 2011)

The 5th edition of the annual TNT - Fortuna Meeting took place on June 15 and June 16, 2011 in Kladno, Czech Republic. The track and field competition, featuring a decathlon (men) and a heptathlon (women) event was part of the top-level 2011 IAAF World Combined Events Challenge.

== Men's Decathlon ==
=== Schedule ===
June 15
1. 100 m
2. Long Jump
3. Shot Put
4. High Jump
5. 400 m

June 16
6. 110 m hurdles
7. Discus Throw
8. Pole Vault
9. Javelin Throw
10. 1,500 m

=== Records ===
World Record	Roman Šebrle (CZE)	9026	May 27, 2001	Götzis, Austria
Event Record	Roman Šebrle (CZE)	8697	June 20, 2007	Kladno, Czech Republic

=== Results ===
The highest mark recorded in each event is highlighted in yellow

Rank	Athlete	Decathlon										Points
Rank	Athlete	1	2	3	4	5	6	7	8	9	10	Points
1	Leonel Suárez (CUB)	11.17	7.02	13.59	2.07	49.55	14.67	45.66	5.00	67.18	4:27.98	8231
2	Hans Van Alphen (BEL)	11.25	7.45	15.04	1.92	49.00	15.02	43.67	4.60	66.21	4:21.78	8120
3	Willem Coertzen (RSA)	11.23	7.26	14.08	2.01	48.87	14.51	42.73	4.50	66.38	4:26.07	8094
4	Dmitriy Karpov (KAZ)	11.02	6.87	16.69	1.98	49.77	14.65	51.18	5.10	51.82	4:52.73	8089
5	Carlos Chinin (BRA)	11.08	7.39	13.57	2.07	49.38	14.33	44.99	4.70	55.47	4:34.42	8068
6	Yordanis García (CUB)	10.85	6.87	14.77	2.01	49.50	14.36	41.97	4.90	59.84	4:34.77	8067
7	Romain Barras (FRA)	11.33	7.15	15.22	1.98	49.75	14.58	43.20	4.60	61.83	4:25.97	8010
8	Kevin Mayer (FRA)	11.23	7.34	12.44	2.01	48.66	14.74	38.64	4.90	60.96	4:19.79	7992
9	Gaël Quérin (FRA)	11.25	7.36	13.37	1.98	48.65	14.57	40.46	4.60	55.11	4:14.52	7939
10	Darius Draudvila (LTU)	10.84	7.27	15.61	1.98	49.49	14.31	41.52	4.50	55.20	5:19.70	7734
11	Stephen Cain (AUS)	11.42	6.90	14.22	1.95	50.39	15.00	42.50	4.80	59.88	4:32.75	7734
12	Brent Newdick (NZL)	11.07	7.06	14.24	1.92	49.62	14.90	44.79	4.60	54.01	4:44.37	7695
13	Einar Lárusson (ISL)	11.20	7.08	12.38	2.01	49.30	14.94	37.01	4.80	54.95	4:40.72	7587
14	Yunior Díaz (CUB)	10.85	6.94	14.05	1.89	47.96	15.57	41.29	4.30	52.33	4:41.40	7510
15	František Staněk (CZE)	11.75	6.80	14.39	1.98	52.66	15.11	38.17	4.80	64.79	4:45.30	7470
16	Adam Nejedlý (CZE)	11.32	7.13	13.24	1.98	50.30	14.55	35.89	4.60	51.84	4:46.80	7435
17	Pavel Baar (CZE)	10.98	6.95	13.52	1.92	50.77	15.60	38.52	4.60	58.57	4:52.92	7396
18	Roman Šebrle (CZE)	11.31	7.21	15.03	1.89	54.33	16.39	43.00	4.60	60.81	4:51.85	7343
19	Michal Štefek (CZE)	11.05	7.30	12.20	2.01	49.44	15.42	34.27	4.20	53.37	4:44.58	7321
20	Scott McLaren (CZE)	11.68	6.86	14.16	1.86	50.16	16.19	41.34	4.40	58.14	4:33.16	7288
21	Jaroslav Hedvičák (CZE)	10.86	7.13	11.95	1.89	49.05	15.06	35.18	4.40	39.55	4:30.87	7219
22	Marek Lukáš (CZE)	11.35	6.94	12.83	1.83	50.49	15.63	36.32	4.00	66.32	4:49.69	7121
—	Lars Albert (GER)	11.62	6.90	—	—	—	—	—	—	—	—	DNF
—	Marcin Dróżdż (POL)	11.53	7.09	14.15	1.98	DNF	15.10	43.44	4.80	—	—	DNF
—	Hamdi Dhouibi (TUN)	11.38	—	—	—	—	—	—	—	—	—	DNF
—	Slaven Dizdarević (SVK)	11.40	6.87	14.39	1.98	52.05	14.93	38.49	4.40	57.61	—	DNF
—	Andrei Krauchanka (BLR)	11.37	7.51	14.35	—	—	—	—	—	—	—	DNF
—	Eduard Mikhan (BLR)	10.83	—	—	—	—	—	—	—	—	—	DNF

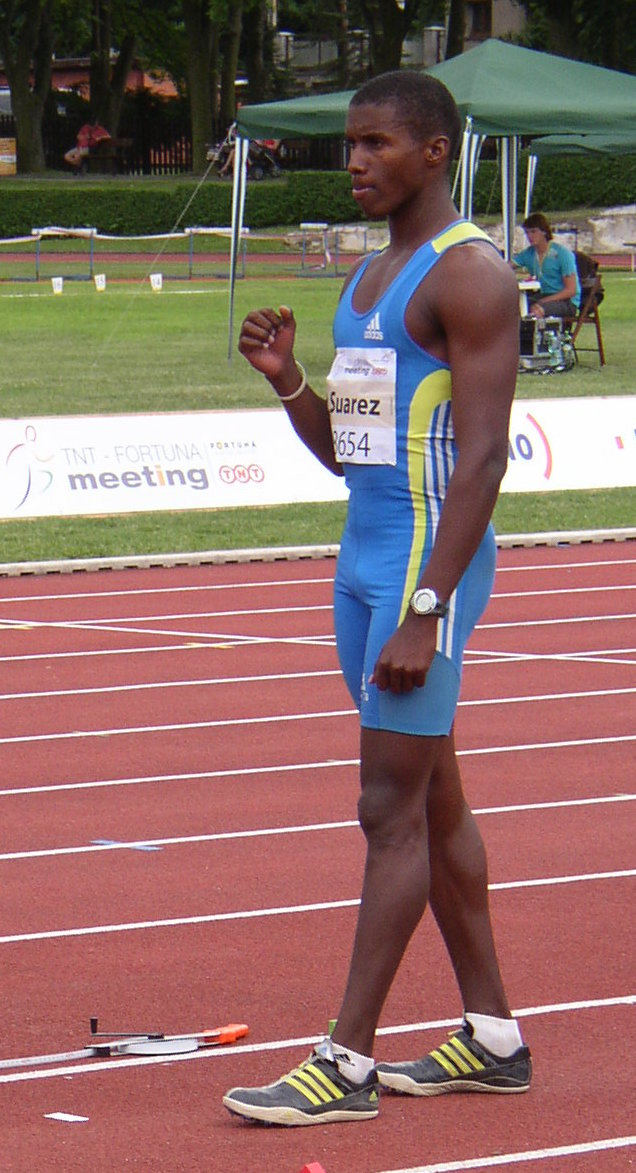
Leonel Suárez

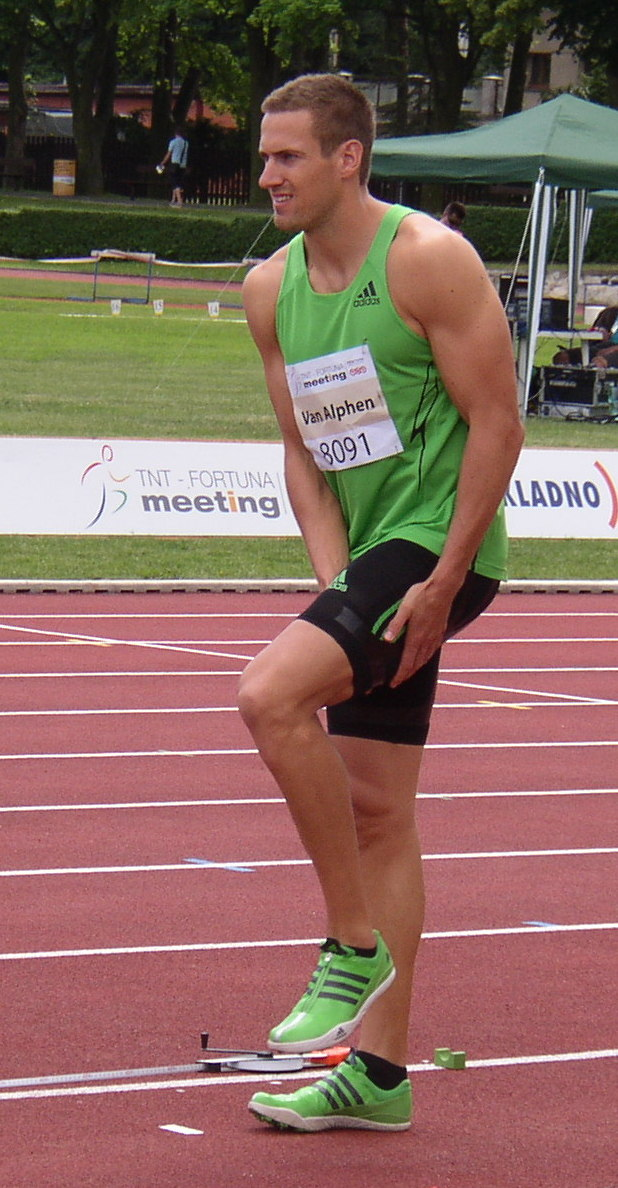
Hans Van Alphen

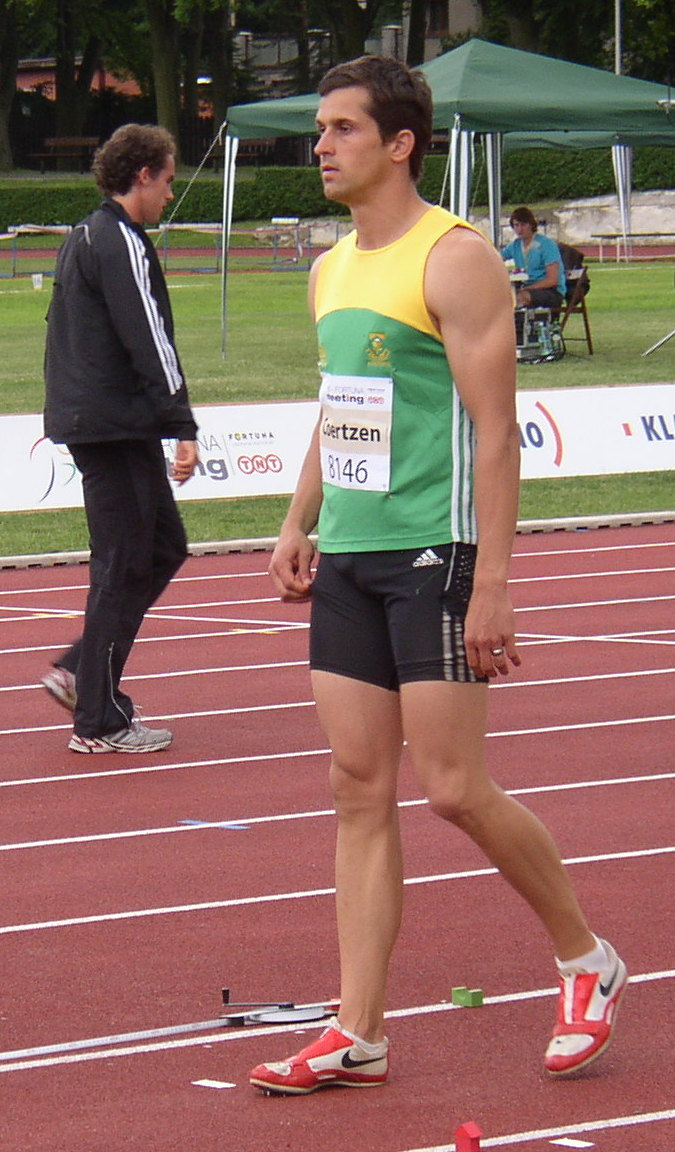
Willem Coertzen

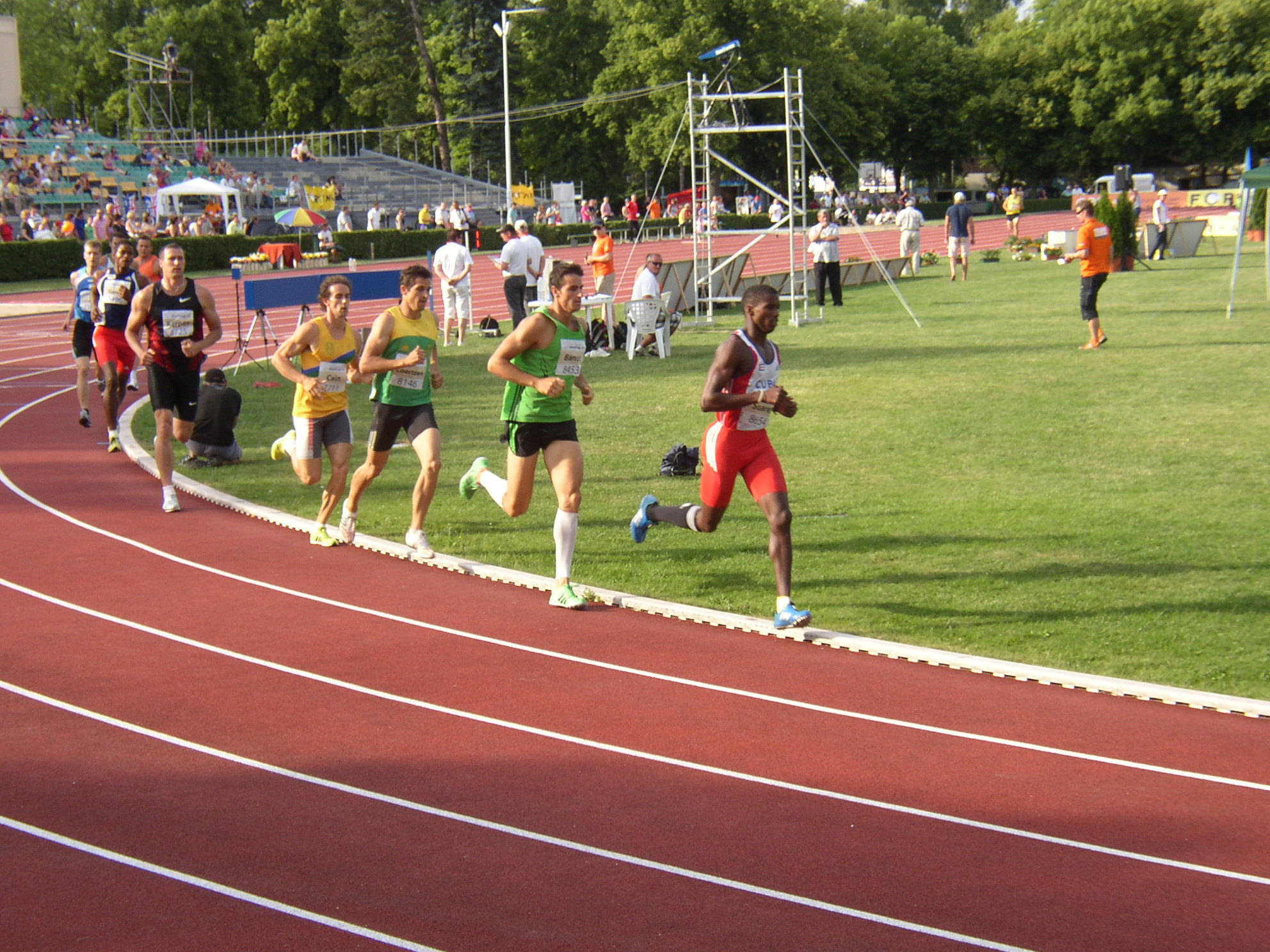
1500 m, heat 2

== Women's Heptathlon ==
=== Schedule ===
June 15
1. 100 m hurdles
2. High Jump
3. Shot Put
4. 200 m

June 16
5. Long Jump
6. Javelin Throw
7. 800 m

=== Records ===
World Record	Jackie Joyner-Kersee (USA)	7291	September 24, 1988	Seoul, South Korea
Event Record	Lyudmyla Blonska (UKR)	6421	June 19, 2008	Kladno, Czech Republic

=== Results ===
The highest mark recorded in each event is highlighted in yellow

Rank	Athlete	Heptathlon							Points
Rank	Athlete	1	2	3	4	5	6	7	Points
1	Tatyana Chernova (RUS)	13.32	1.83	13.22	23.32	6.59	52.00	2:10.62	6773
2	Karolina Tymińska (POL)	13.35	1.74	14.41	23.52	6.58	40.17	2:08.33	6516
3	Aiga Grabuste (LAT)	13.81	1.74	12.73	24.42	6.65	43.13	2:13.68	6252
4	Kateřina Cachová (CZE)	14.21	1.77	11.40	24.75	5.85	44.89	2:13.74	5897
5	Helga Thorsteinsdóttir (ISL)	14.95	1.77	13.68	26.05	5.45	50.84	2:11.76	5856
6	Jolanda Keizer (NED)	14.38	1.71	14.65	25.22	5.63	41.79	2:16.80	5804
7	Ida Marcussen (NOR)	14.56	1.68	12.96	25.63	5.92	41.55	2:12.73	5733
8	Sarah Cowley (NZL)	14.26	1.80	11.40	25.85	6.03	34.12	2:16.92	5631
9	Lucia Slaničková (SVK)	14.94	1.68	11.72	25.60	5.85	42.69	2:15.56	5564
10	Janet Lawless (RSA)	13.83	1.74	10.54	25.11	5.81	33.85	2:19.49	5520
11	Izabela Mikołajczyk (POL)	14.59	1.77	10.48	24.78	5.70	38.11	2:24.96	5453
12	Diane Barras (FRA)	14.05	1.74	10.64	26.23	5.69	37.75	2:26.10	5345
13	Alena Galertová (CZE)	15.02	1.62	12.02	26.77	5.45	38.38	2:28.99	5019
14	Vanessa Chefer (BRA)	14.53	1.62	12.52	24.61	5.80	35.32	DNF	4650
15	Aneta Komrsková (CZE)	15.00	1.59	09.89	27.10	5.46	34.69	2:49.33	4517
—	Susan Coltman (CAN)	14.62	1.62	12.32	26.16	5.79	30.24	—	DNF

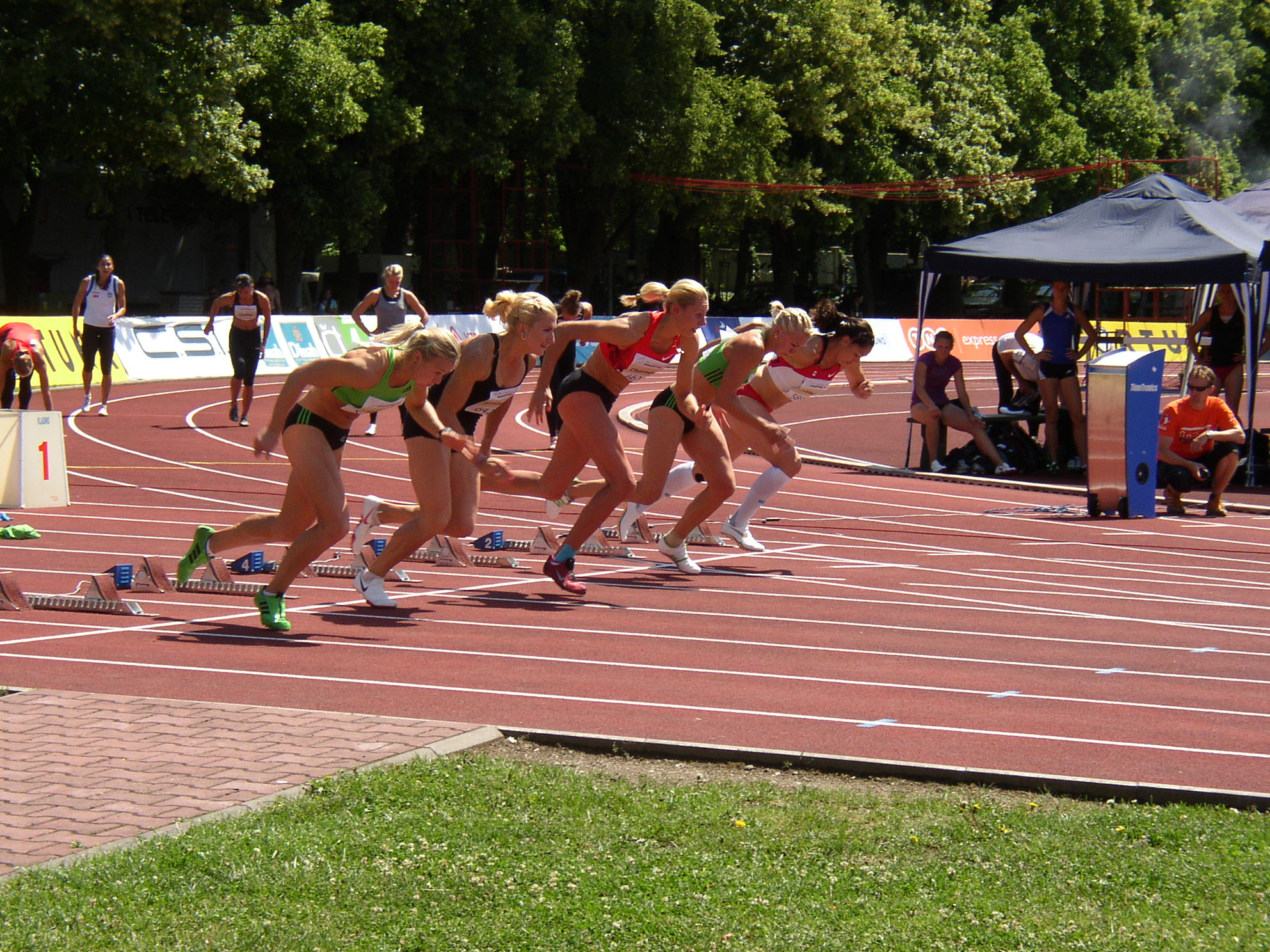
100 m hurdles, heat 1

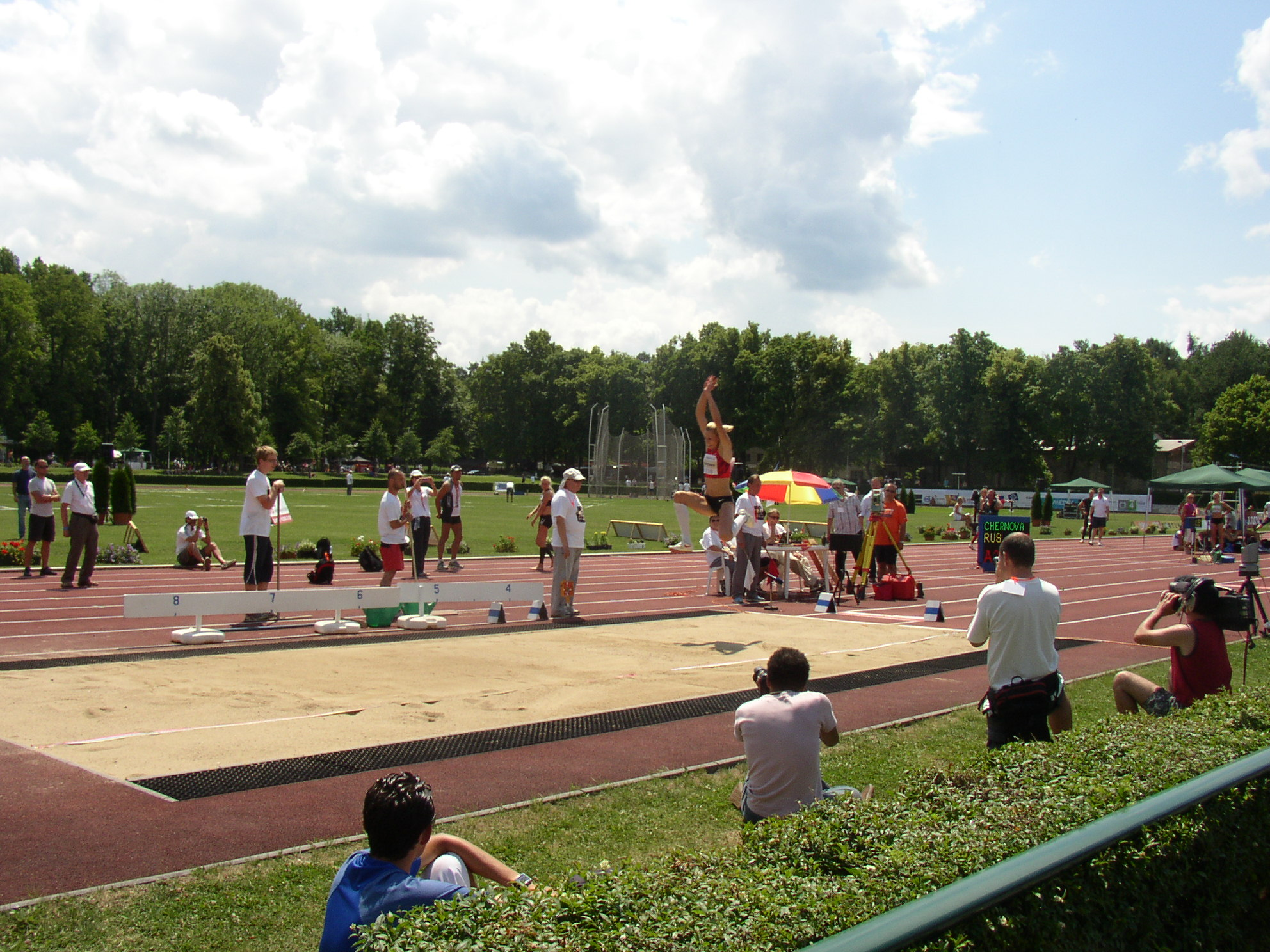
Long jump

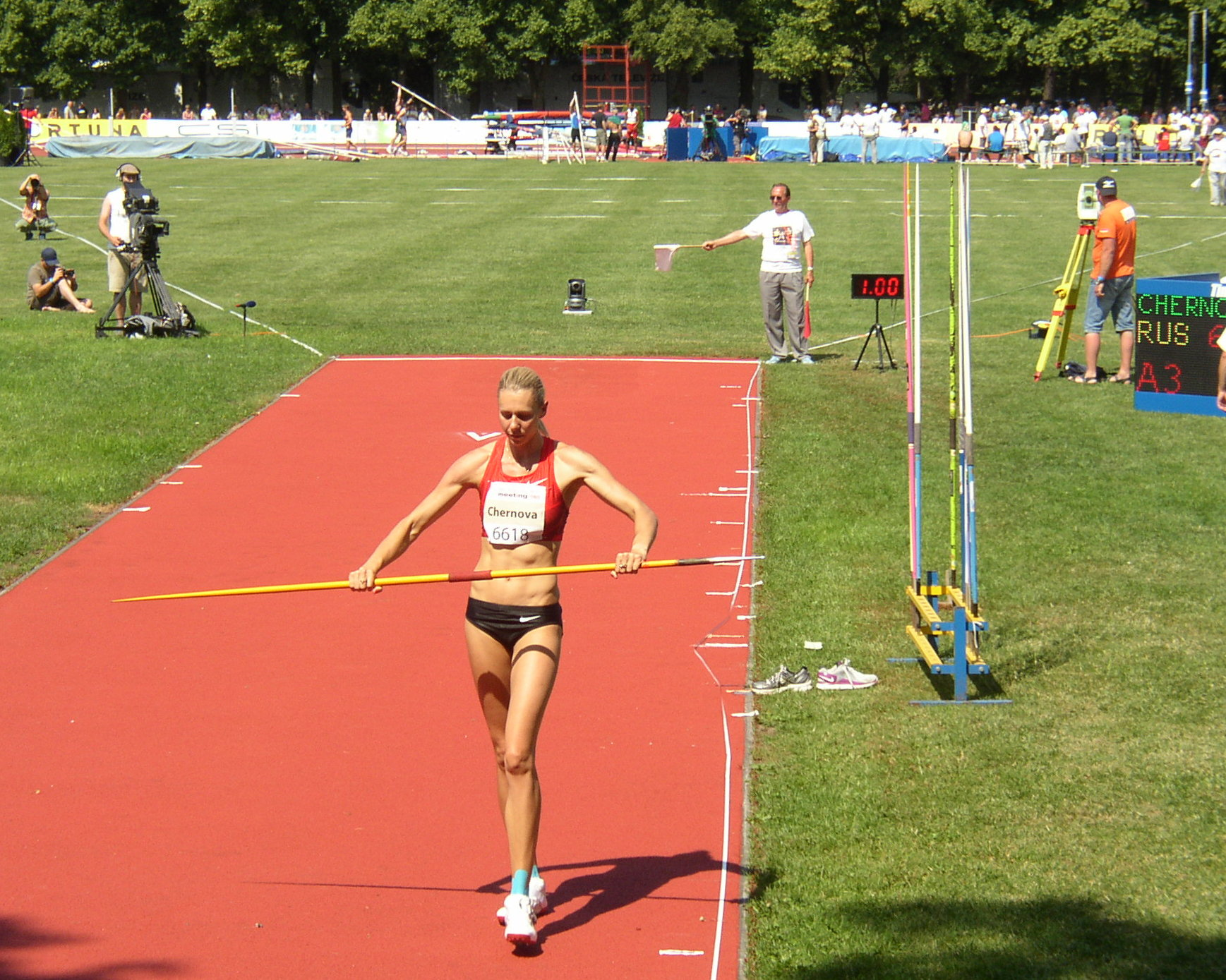
Javelin throw

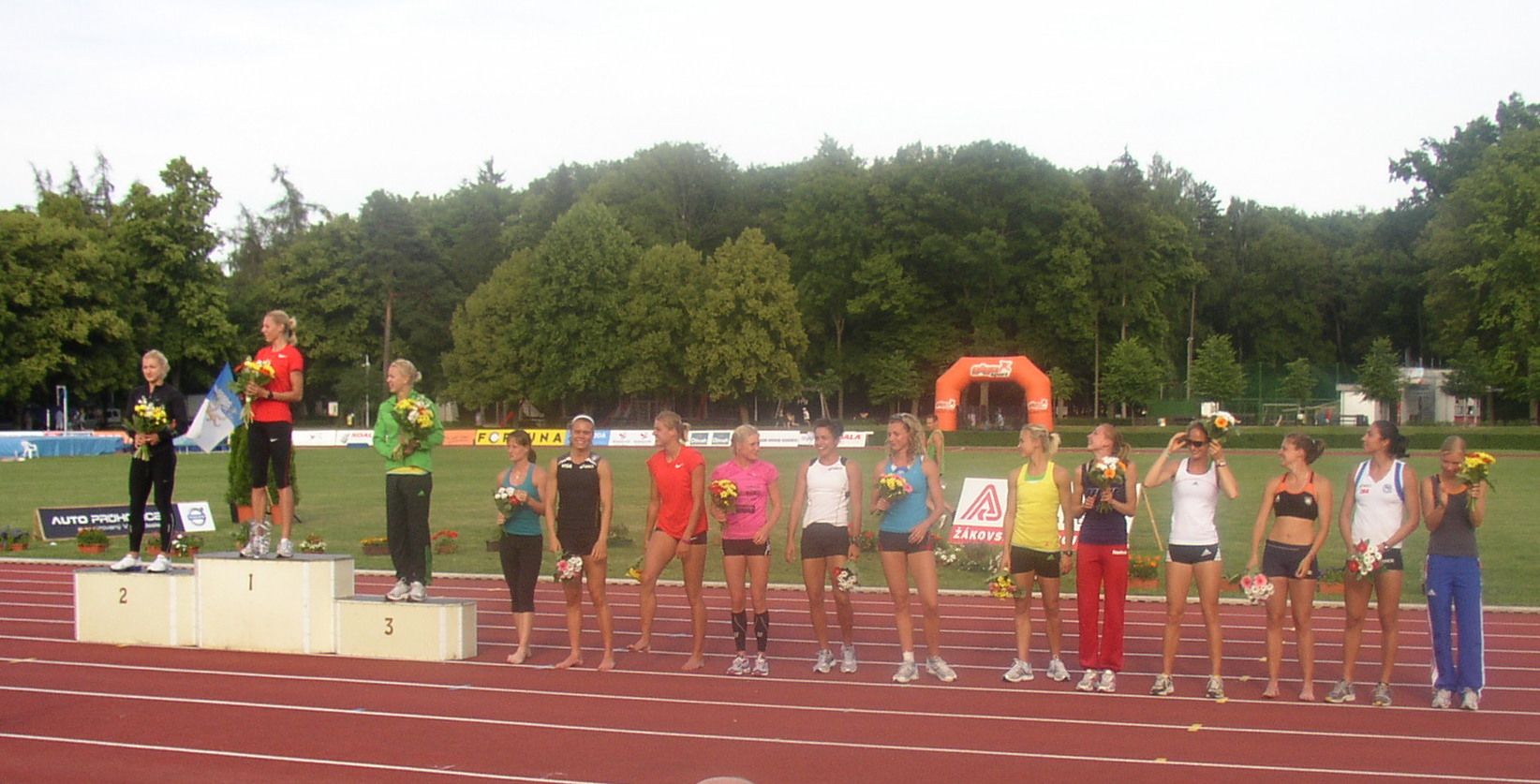
Victory ceremony

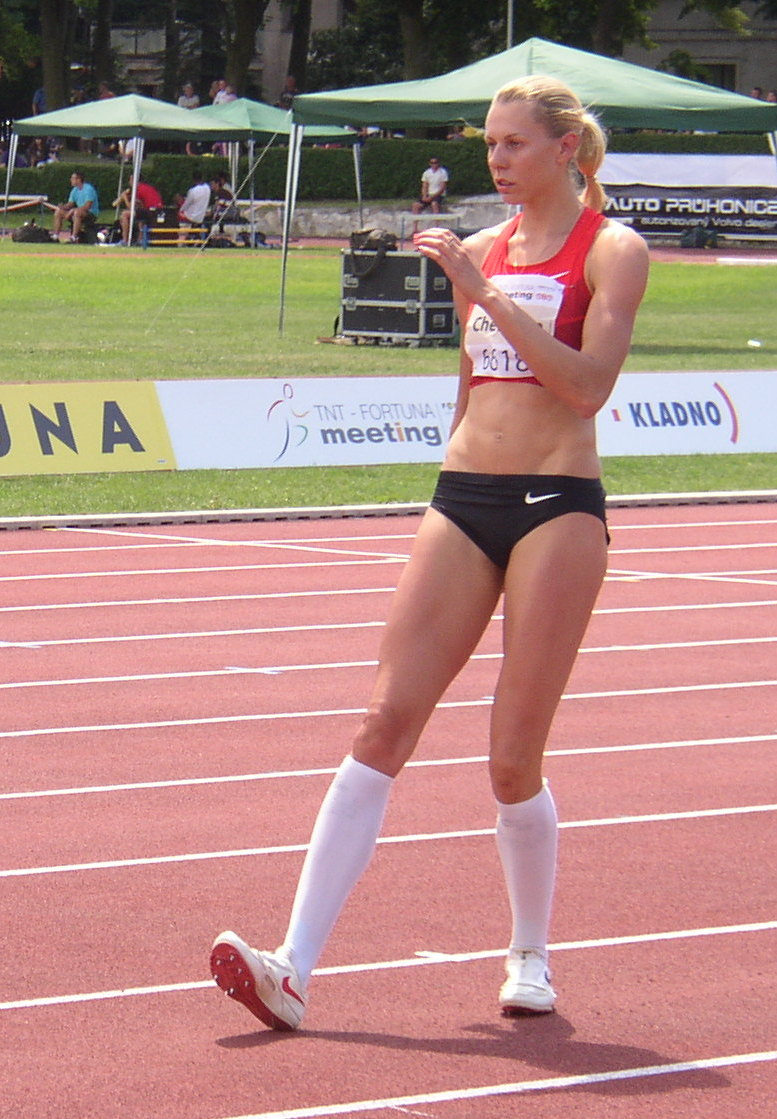
Tatyana Chernova

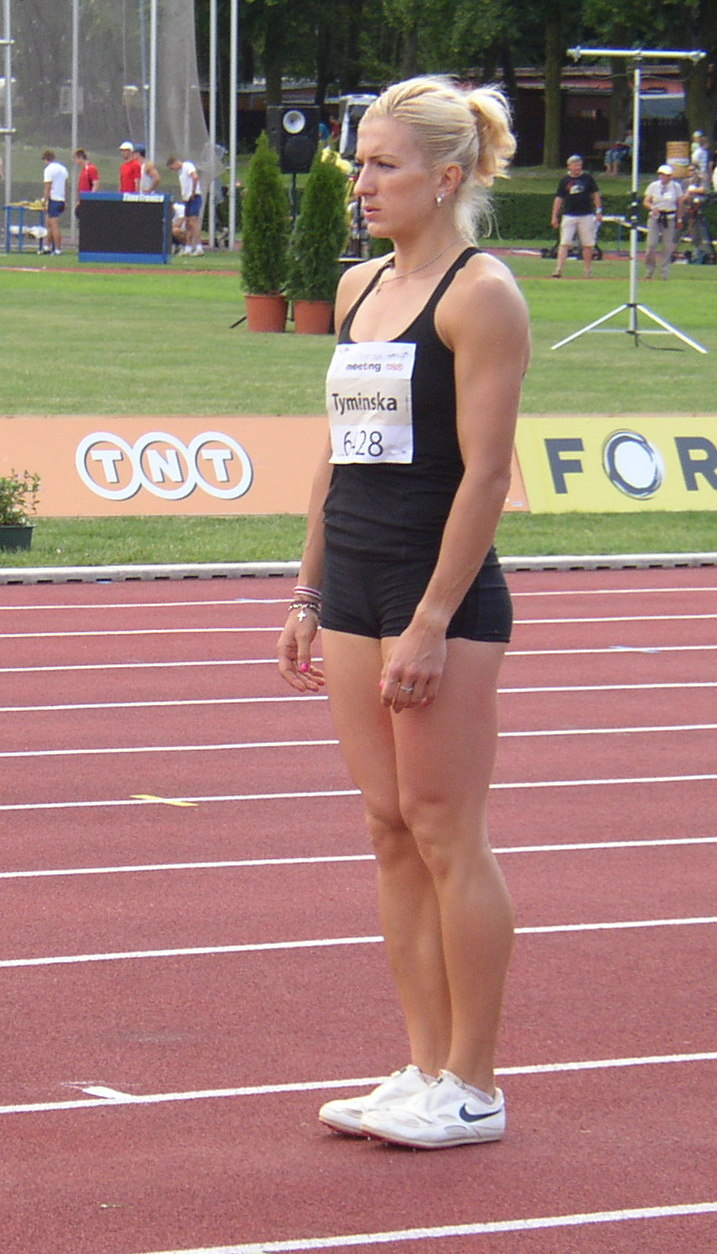
Karolina Tymińska

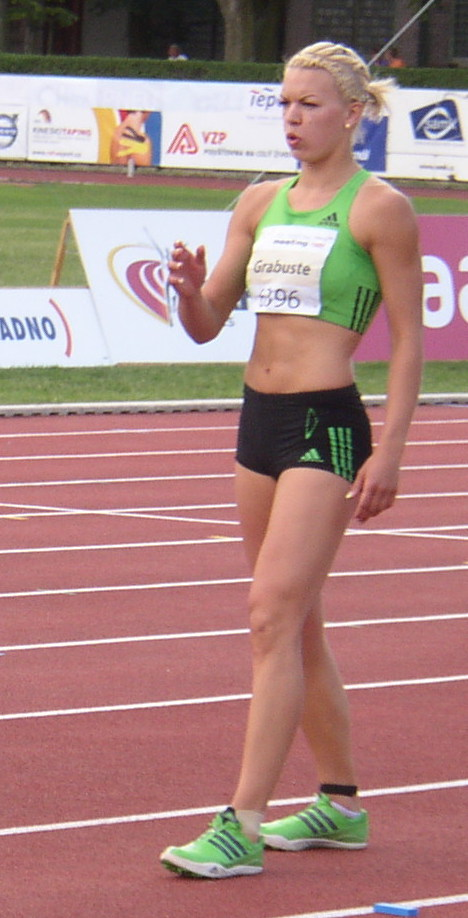
Aiga Grabuste

== See also ==
- 2011 Decathlon Year Ranking
- 2011 World Championships in Athletics – Men's decathlon
- 2011 World Championships in Athletics – Women's heptathlon
