= 2007 European Athletics U23 Championships – Men's decathlon =

The men's decathlon event at the 2007 European Athletics U23 Championships was held in Debrecen, Hungary, at Gyulai István Atlétikai Stadion on 12 and 13 July.

== Medalists ==
Gold	Andrei Krauchanka; Belarus
Silver	Pascal Behrenbruch; Germany
Bronze	Arkadiy Vasilyev; Russia

== Results ==
=== Final ===
12-13 July

The highest mark recorded in each event is highlighted in yellow

Rank	Name	Nationality	100m	LJ	SP	HJ	400m	110m H	DT	PV	JT	1500m	Points	Notes
1st place, gold medalist(s)	Andrei Krauchanka	Belarus	11.02 (w: -0.2 m/s)	7.71 w (w: 3.5 m/s)	13.44	2.14	47.61	14.22 (w: -0.3 m/s)	43.31	5.10	59.80	4:30.83	8492	CR
2nd place, silver medalist(s)	Pascal Behrenbruch	Germany	10.84 (w: -0.2 m/s)	7.01 (w: 0.8 m/s)	16.10	2.02	50.40	14.13 (w: -0.3 m/s)	49.55	4.40	69.55	4:50.09	8239	
3rd place, bronze medalist(s)	Arkadiy Vasilyev	Russia	10.93 w (w: 2.7 m/s)	7.41 (w: 0.8 m/s)	14.62	1.99	50.02	14.55 (w: -0.3 m/s)	46.94	4.60	63.08	4:32.21	8179	
4	Oleksiy Kasyanov	Ukraine	10.75 (w: -0.2 m/s)	7.59 (w: 1.4 m/s)	14.45	1.96	48.35	14.84 (w: -0.3 m/s)	42.89	4.10	55.84	4:27.35	7964	
5	Pelle Rietveld	Netherlands	10.90 w (w: 2.7 m/s)	7.27 (w: 1.8 m/s)	13.80	1.87	48.67	14.62 (w: -0.3 m/s)	35.84	4.90	63.35	4:26.35	7955	
6	Michael Schrader	Germany	11.08 (w: -0.2 m/s)	7.15 (w: 1.6 m/s)	12.73	1.96	49.06	15.24 (w: -0.3 m/s)	40.78	4.70	56.57	4:31.57	7709	
7	Vasiliy Kharlamov	Russia	11.27 w (w: 2.7 m/s)	7.31 w (w: 3.0 m/s)	13.13	1.90	50.75	15.05 (w: -0.3 m/s)	43.83	4.70	56.77	4:32.41	7681	
8	Ingmar Vos	Netherlands	11.09 w (w: 2.7 m/s)	7.07 w (w: 2.1 m/s)	12.98	1.93	52.54	15.17 (w: -0.3 m/s)	40.12	3.90	60.17	4:29.96	7349	
9	Christian Laugesen	Denmark	11.51 (w: -0.2 m/s)	6.91 (w: 1.1 m/s)	11.52	1.90	50.34	14.89 (w: -0.3 m/s)	36.55	4.00	45.59	4:28.26	6987	
10	Franck Logel	France	11.06 w (w: 2.7 m/s)	7.08 w (w: 2.6 m/s)	11.61	1.99	50.48	14.92 (w: -0.3 m/s)	40.38	4.60	49.29	DNF	6749	
	Maxime Gonguet	France	11.24 w (w: 2.7 m/s)	7.02 (w: 1.2 m/s)	13.28	1.93							DNF	
	Edgars Eriņš	Latvia	11.20 (w: -0.2 m/s)	6.62 (w: 2.0 m/s)	14.08	1.78							DNF	

== Participation ==
According to an unofficial count, 12 athletes from 8 countries participated in the event.

- Belarus (1)
- Denmark (1)
- France (2)
- Germany (2)
- Latvia (1)
- Netherlands (2)
- Russia (2)
- Ukraine (1)
