= Kaleria Kislova =

Soviet and Russian television director (1926–2025)

Kaleria Venediktovna Kislova (20 April 1926 – 10 May 2025) was a Soviet and Russian television director.

== Early life and education ==
Kislova was born on 20 April 1926 in the village of Kargat, Siberia, to Venedikt Alexandrovich Kislov, an agronomist and Feona Stepanovna Kobyakova.

She spent her childhood in the Siberian village of Maslyanino. At the age of 15, having learned about the tour of the Romen Theater in neighboring Novosibirsk, she went there to see her idol, the artist Lyalya Chernaya. Attending performances, she was able to get acquainted with Lyalya and, under her influence, decided to connect her life with the theater.

She studied at the studio of the Novosibirsk theater "Red Torch", and then at GITIS, after graduation she worked for some time in provincial theaters.

== Career ==
In 1951, she was an actress of the Kazakh Drama Theater.

In 1961, she came to television, becoming an assistant director at the Novosibirsk studio, but in the same year she moved to the capital, to the Youth Editorial Office of the Central Television.

In 1974, she began working in the Main Editorial Office of the Central Television (including the creation of the Vremya program), three years later she was appointed chief director of the editorial office.

For several decades, she supervised the filming of the main events of the country (the 1980 Olympics, the first teleconference between the USSR and the United States, etc.) and its leaders (according to E. Andreeva, Kislova was the only one whom B. N. Yeltsin "allowed to correct himself, replant, set the light correctly", the only one from the editorial office who had access to state secrets. Since 1975, she was actually the personal director of L. I. Brezhnev, who, at the suggestion of Heydar Aliyev, called Kaleria "our Miss Television".

In 2006, she resigned from the position of chief director and became a consulting director, as of 2025 she was one of the oldest employees of Channel One.

== Death ==
Kislova died on 10 May 2025, at the age of 99. She is buried at the Troyekurovskoye Cemetery.

== Awards ==
Koslova was awarded the Honored Artist of the RSFSR (1985), laureate of the State Prize of the USSR (1977). In 1977–2006 she was the chief director of the Vremya program and Member of the Communist Party of the Soviet Union (1965–1991).
