= Hans Van Alphen =

Belgian decathlete

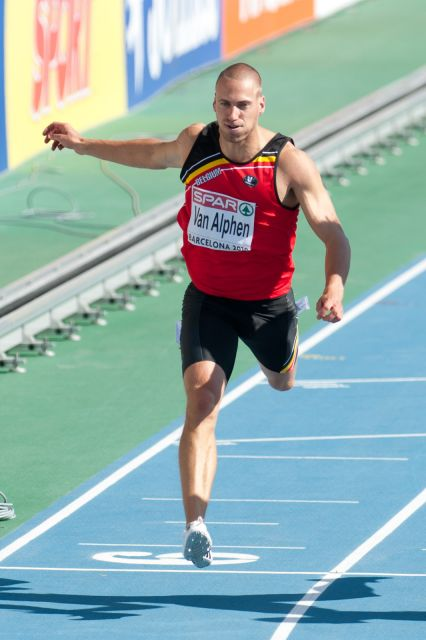

Personal information
- Full name: Hans Van Alphen
- Born: 12 January 1982 (age 44) Turnhout, Belgium
- Height: 6 ft 3 in (1.91 m)
- Weight: 203 lb (92 kg)

Sport
- Country: Belgium
- Sport: Track and field athletics
- Event: Decathlon
- Club: Vilvoorde AC

Hans Van Alphen (born 12 January 1982, in Turnhout) is a Belgian decathlete.

Van Alphen won the silver medal at the 2007 Summer Universiade and finished eleventh at the 2007 World Championships. In 2005, he became Belgian champion in the decathlon. He was the first Belgian decathlete to pass the 8000 points limit.

In 2008, Van Alphen was a competitor in the decathlon of the Beijing Olympics, but did not finish all the events due to injury.

He was just below the 8000-point mark at the 2010 Hypo-Meeting, where he came 13th, then he set a personal best score of 8072 points to finish fifth at the 2010 European Championships in Barcelona. Continuing in that vein, he set a best in the men's heptathlon at the 2011 European Athletics Indoor Championships, taking ninth place with a total of 5938 points. Turning to the outdoor circuit, he improved a number of event bests at the Hypo-Meeting (including the 100 metres, high jump and long jump) and ended the competition in eleventh place with 8045 points. At the 2011 TNT - Fortuna Meeting in Kladno he put together his best series of results: following a best of 66.21 m in the javelin, he moved up four places in the final 1500 metres to take the runner-up spot behind Leonel Suárez with a decathlon personal best of 8120 points.

In 2012 he won the decathlon at the Hypo-Meeting with a score of 8519. He ended fourth in the decathlon at the 2012 London Olympics. He ended the year with a win at the Decastar.

== Personal bests ==
Outdoor
100 m - 10.96 (2012)
400 m - 48.25 (2007)
1500 m - 4:17.51 (2009)
110 m hurdles - 14.55 (2012)
High jump - 2.06 m (2012)
Pole vault - 4.96 m (2012)
Long jump - 7.64 m (2012)
Shot put - 15.97 m (2014)
Discus throw - 51.89 m (2012)
Javelin throw - 67.59 m (2012)
Decathlon - 8519 pts (May 26/27, 2012, Götzis)

Indoor
60 m - 7.08 (2008)
1000 m - 2:37.06 (2011)
60 m hurdles - 8.19 (2006)
High jump - 1.94 m (2011)
Pole vault - 4.90 m (2011)
Long jump - 7.34 m (2006)
Shot put - 15.63 m (2010)
Heptathlon - 5938 pts (2011)

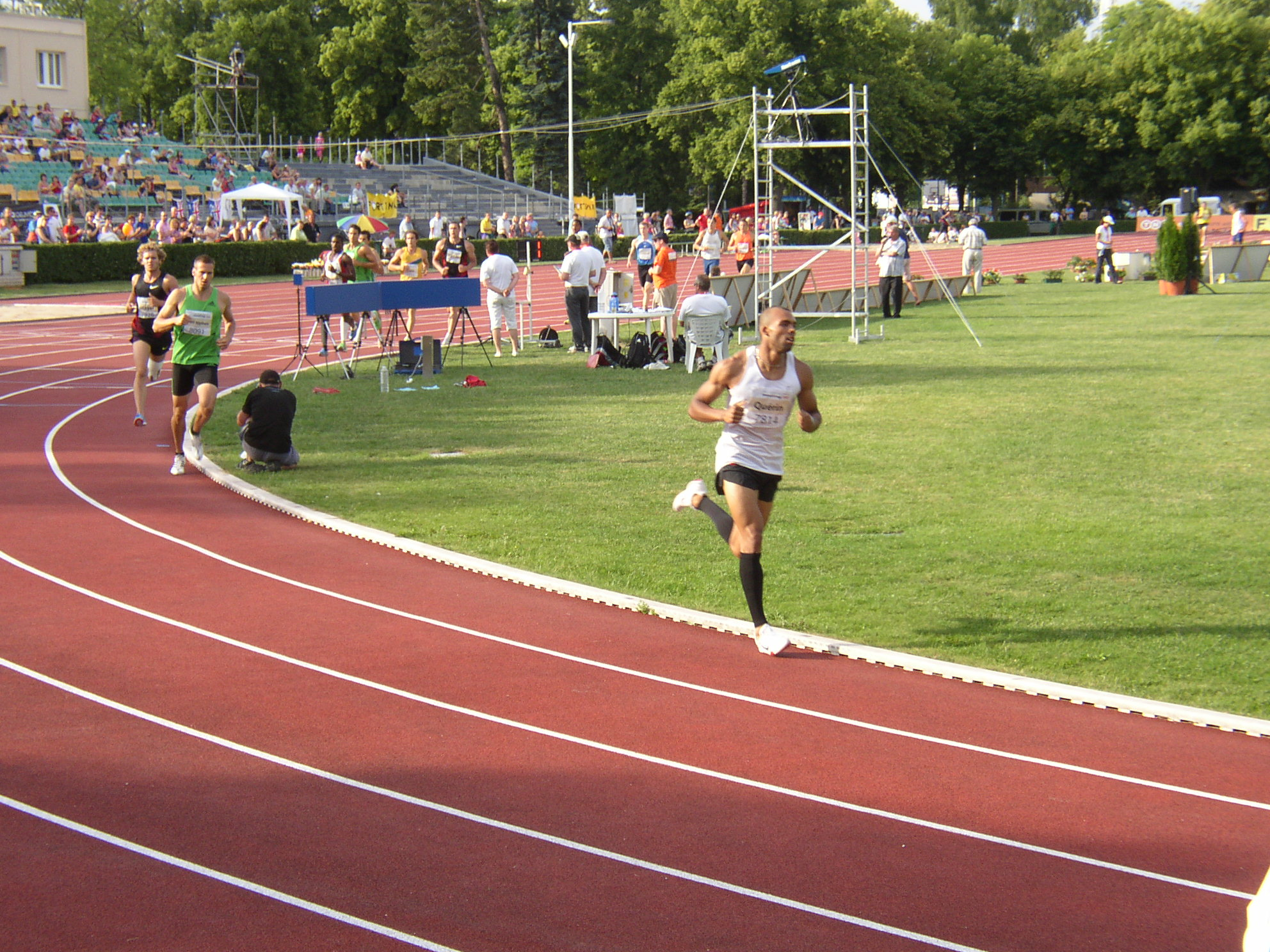
Hans Van Alphen (left in green) running 1500m at the 2011 TNT - Fortuna Meeting in Kladno

== Competition record ==
Year	Competition	Venue	Position	Event	Notes
Representing Belgium
2005	Belgian Championship	Izegem, Belgium	1st	Decathlon	7064 pts
2006	Nordrhein-Mehrkampfmeisterschaften	Wesel, Germany	3rd	Decathlon	7411 pts
2007	Universiade	Bangkok, Thailand	2nd	Decathlon	8047 pts
2007	World Championships	Osaka, Japan	11th	Decathlon	8034 pts
2008	Olympic Games	Beijing, China	-	Decathlon	DNF
2010	European Championships	Barcelona, Spain	5th	Decathlon	8072 pts
2011	Hypo-Meeting	Götzis, Austria	11th	Decathlon	8045 pts
2011	TNT - Fortuna Meeting	Kladno, Czech Republic	2nd	Decathlon	8120pts
2011	Décastar	Talence, France	1st	Decathlon	8200 pts
2012	Hypo-Meeting	Götzis, Austria	1st	Decathlon	8519 pts
2012	Olympic Games	London, England	4th	Decathlon	8447 pts
2012	Décastar	Talence, France	1st	Decathlon	8293 pts
