= Aleksandr Kislov =

Russian decathlete

Aleksandr Sergeyevich Kislov (Russian: Александр Серге́евич Кислов; born 4 November 1984) is a Russian decathlete. He is a one-time indoor champion.

== Achievements ==
Year	Competition	Venue	Position	Event	Notes
Representing Russia
2011	European Indoor Championships	Paris, France	7th	Heptathlon	5970
