= Brent Newdick =

New Zealand decathlete (born 1985)

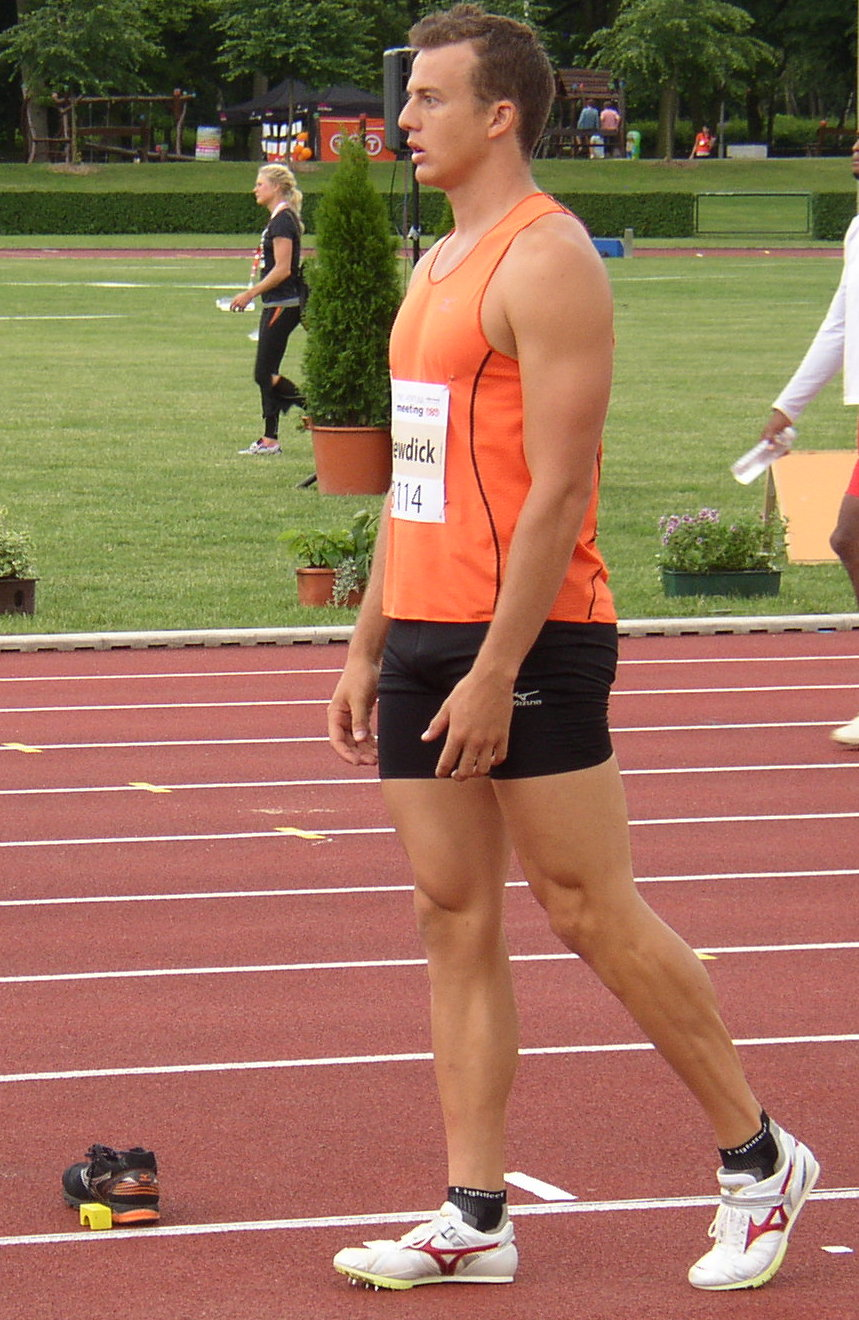
- Brent Newdick at the 2011 TNT - Fortuna Meeting in Kladno

Personal information
- Born: 31 January 1985 (age 41) Tauranga, New Zealand
- Height: 1.86 m (6 ft 1 in)
- Weight: 90 kg (198 lb) (2014)

Sport
- Sport: athletics
- Event: Decathlon
- College team: Auckland University of Technology
Medal record
Men's athletics
Representing New Zealand
Commonwealth Games
Silver medal – second place	2010 Delhi	Decathlon
Universiade
Silver medal – second place	2009 Belgrade	Decathlon
Bronze medal – third place	2013 Kazan	Decathlon

Brent Newdick (born 31 January 1985 in Tauranga) is a New Zealand representative decathlete.

He won the silver medal in the men's decathlon at the 2010 Commonwealth Games, and placed 12th in the 2012 Summer Olympics.

He was also the reigning champion of the Taihape Gumboot Throwing Competition until 2017.

== Achievements ==
Year	Competition	Venue	Position	Event	Notes
Representing New Zealand
2001	World Youth Championships	Debrecen, Hungary	23rd	Decathlon (youth)	5310 pts
2004	World Junior Championships	Grosseto, Italy	16th	Decathlon (junior)	6331 pts
2006	Commonwealth Games	Melbourne, Australia	4th	Decathlon	7566 pts
2009	Universiade	Belgrade, Serbia	2nd	Decathlon	7874 pts
2009	World Championships	Berlin, Germany	23rd	Decathlon	7915 pts
2010	Commonwealth Games	Delhi, India	2nd	Decathlon	7899 pts
2011	World Championships	Daegu, South Korea	19th	Decathlon	7761 pts
2012	Olympic Games	London, United Kingdom	12th	Decathlon	7988 pts
2013	Universiade	Kazan, Russia	3rd	Decathlon	7611 pts
2013	World Championships	Moscow, Russia	23rd	Decathlon	7744 pts
2014	Commonwealth Games	Glasgow, United Kingdom	–	Decathlon	DNF
2015	Oceania Championships	Cairns, Queensland, Australia	1st	Decathlon	7140 pts

== Personal bests ==
Event	Points	Place	Date
Decathlon	8114	Götzis	2011-05-29
