= Ingmar Vos =

Dutch decathlete (born 1986)

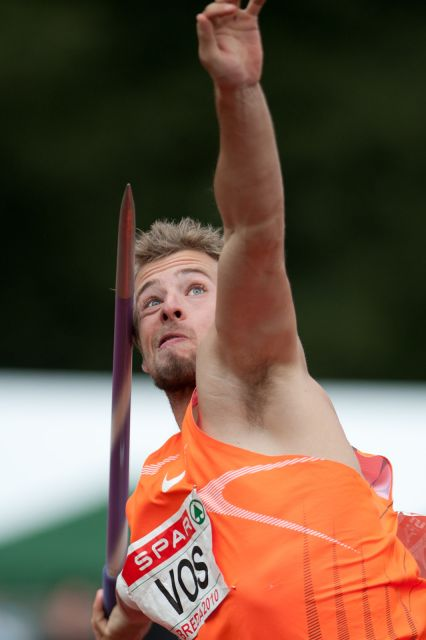
Ingmar Vos during a Track Meeting in Breda

Ingmar Vos (born 28 May 1986 in Rotterdam) is a former Dutch athlete who specialised in the Decathlon and Heptathlon.

== Biography ==
Competing at a national level since his mid teens, Vos came second in the Dutch National Youth Championships in 2003, and two years later he won the Dutch Junior A all-rounders title. As part of the Dutch team in the 2005 European Athletics Junior Championships in Kaunas he came tenth.

Becoming a Senior in 2006 Vos won a silver medal at the Dutch Championships indoor combined events and a bronze medal at the Dutch Decathlon Championships. The next year he won a bronze medal at the national indoor championships, and came eighth in the decathlon at the 2007 European Athletics U23 Championships. In 2008, Vos took part in all national championships held in the Netherlands. In order to win a place on the Dutch team for the 2009 World Athletics Championships, in Berlin, Vos competed in a number of events throughout Europe including the Hypo Meeting in Götzis, Austria, at which he came thirteenth. At the 2009 World Athletics Championships Vos finished twentieth. At the 2010 European Athletics Championships, in Barcelona, Spain he came eleventh and fifth in the Men's heptathlon at the 2011 European Athletics Indoor Championships

Vos was affiliated with two clubs, PAC Rotterdam and Ilion Zoetermeer. On 17 June 2017 Vos made public that he had retired from competition.

== Achievements ==
Year	Competition	Venue	Position	Event	Notes
Representing Netherlands
2007	European U23 Championships	Debrecen, Hungary	8th	Decathlon	7349 pts
2009	World Championships	Berlin, Germany	20th	Decathlon	8009
2010	European Championships	Barcelona, Spain	11th	Decathlon	7981
2011	European Indoor Championships	Paris, France	5th	Heptathlon	6020
2012	Summer Olympics	London, England	21st	Decathlon	7805
