= Mikko Halvari =

Finnish decathlete (born 1983)

Personal information
- Full name: Mikko Johannes Halvari
- Nationality: Finland
- Born: 4 March 1983 (age 43) Porvoo, Finland
- Height: 1.83 m (6 ft 0 in)
- Weight: 93 kg (205 lb)

Sport
- Sport: Athletics
- Event: Decathlon
- Club: Tuusulanjärven Urheilijat (FIN)
- Coached by: Jussi Välimäki

Achievements and titles
- Personal best: Decathlon: 7,736 points (2010)
Medal record
Men's athletics
Representing Finland
World Junior Championships
Bronze medal – third place	2002 Kingston	Decathlon

Mikko Johannes Halvari (born March 4, 1983, in Porvoo) is a Finnish decathlete. He won a bronze medal for his category at the 2002 IAAF World Junior Championships in Kingston, Jamaica, with a solid score of 7,587 points. He is also a full-time member of Tuusulanjärven Urheilijat, a local track and field club in Tuusula, and is coached and trained by Jussi Välimäki.

At age twenty-five, Halvari made his official debut for the 2008 Summer Olympics in Beijing, where he competed in men's decathlon. During the event, he set a personal best of 1.93 metres in the high jump; however, he failed to clear a height in the pole vault, which cost him a chance for a medal. In the end, Halvari finished only in twenty-sixth place, with a total score of 6,486 points.

== Personal bests ==
Event	Performance	Location	Date
100 metres	10.87	Kingston	July 16, 2002
400 metres	49.79	Barcelona	July 28, 2010
1500 metres	4:48.97	Kingston	July 16, 2002
110 metres hurdles	14.82	Szczecin	July 8, 2007
Long jump	7.23	Zaragoza	June 27, 2009
High jump	1.93	Beijing	August 21, 2008
Pole vault	4.70	Szczecin	July 8, 2007
Shot put	14.60	Täby	June 5, 2010
Discus throw	52.42	Täby	June 6, 2010
Javelin throw	63.70	Jyväskylä	June 29, 2008
Decathlon	7736	Täby	June 6, 2010
Heptathlon (indoor)	5414	Jyväskylä	February 15, 2004
