= 2007 in the decathlon =

This page lists the World Best Year Performance in the year 2007 in the men's decathlon. The main event during this season were the 2007 World Championships in Osaka, Japan, where the competition was held at the Nagai Stadium on Friday August 31 and Saturday September 1.

== Records ==
Standing records prior to the 2007 season in track and field
World Record	Roman Šebrle (CZE)	9026	May 27, 2001	Götzis, Austria

== 2007 World Year Ranking ==
Rank	Points	Athlete	Venue	Date	Note
1	8697	Roman Šebrle (CZE)	Kladno, Czech Republic	2007-06-20	
2	8644	Maurice Smith (JAM)	Osaka, Japan	2007-09-01	NR
3	8617	Andrei Krauchanka (BLR)	Götzis, Austria	2007-05-27	PB
4	8586	Dmitriy Karpov (KAZ)	Osaka, Japan	2007-09-01	
5	8493	Bryan Clay (USA)	Götzis, Austria	2007-05-27	
6	8475	Aleksey Drozdov (RUS)	Osaka, Japan	2007-09-01	
7	8371	André Niklaus (GER)	Osaka, Japan	2007-09-01	
8	8357	Aleksey Sysoyev (RUS)	Osaka, Japan	2007-09-01	
9	8352	Tom Pappas (USA)	Indianapolis, United States	2007-06-23	
10	8298	Romain Barras (FRA)	Kladno, Czech Republic	2007-06-20	
11	8271	Jānis Karlivāns (LAT)	Götzis, Austria	2007-05-27	
12	8269	Arthur Abele (GER)	Ratingen, Germany	2007-06-17	
13	8257	Yordanis García (CUB)	Osaka, Japan	2007-09-01	
14	8255	Norman Müller (GER)	Götzis, Austria	2007-05-27	
15	8239	Pascal Behrenbruch (GER)	Debrecen, Hungary	2007-07-13	
16	8215	Jake Arnold (USA)	Sacramento, United States	2007-06-07	
17	8179	Arkadiy Vasilyev (RUS)	Debrecen, Hungary	2007-07-13	
18	8156	Leonel Suárez (CUB)	Santiago de Cuba, Cuba	2007-03-11	
19	8134	Paul Terek (USA)	Desenzano del Garda, Italy	2007-05-06	
20	8101	Aliaksandr Parkhomenka (BLR)	Tallinn, Estonia	2007-07-08	
21	8099	Jacob Minah (GER)	Bangkok, Thailand	2007-08-13	
22	8047	Hans Van Alphen (BEL)	Bangkok, Thailand	2007-08-13	
23	8042	Alberto Juantorena (CUB)	Havana, Cuba	2007-06-22	
24	8028	Mikalai Shubianok (BLR)	Minsk, Belarus	2007-05-19	
25	8020	Tomáš Dvořák (CZE)	Kladno, Czech Republic	2007-06-20	

== See also ==
- 2007 Décastar
- 2007 Hypo-Meeting
