= List of Saint Kitts and Nevis records in athletics =

The following are the national records in athletics in Saint Kitts and Nevis maintained by the country's national athletics federation: Saint Kitts & Nevis Amateur Athletic Association (SKNAAA).

== Outdoor ==
Key to tables: Awaiting ratification Record not kept by SKNAAA Not ratified or later rescinded by SKNAAA

=== Men ===
Event	Record	Athlete	Date	Meet	Place	Ref.
60 m	6.59 (−0.7 m/s)	Kim Collins	3 August 2013	Grand Prix of Cheb	Cheb, Czech Republic	
100 y	9.29+ (+1.1 m/s)	Kim Collins	31 May 2011	Golden Spike Ostrava	Ostrava, Czech Republic	
100 m	9.93 (+1.9 m/s)	Kim Collins	29 May 2016	NRW-Gala	Bottrop, Germany	
150 m (bend)	15.35	Kim Collins	3 August 2013	Grand Prix of Cheb	Cheb, Czech Republic	
150 m (straight)	15.03 (−0.2 m/s)	Kim Collins	14 September 2013	Great City Games	Newcastle, United Kingdom	
200 m	20.08 (+1.6 m/s)	Antoine Adams	22 June 2014	National Invitational and Club Championships	Basseterre, Saint Kitts and Nevis	
200 m (straight)	20.59 (−0.4 m/s)	Kim Collins	16 May 2010	Manchester City Games	Manchester, United Kingdom	
400 m	45.68	Warren Hazel	22 July 2017	Blue Marlin Track Classic	Freeport, Bahamas	
800 m	1:49.96	Ian Godwin	27 June 1996		Kingston, Jamaica	
1500 m	3:57.67	Masai Jeffers	3 July 2016	OECS Championships	Road Town, British Virgin Islands	
3000 m	9:21.4 h	Spencer Elliot	7 April 1983		Basseterre, Saint Kitts and Nevis	
5000 m	15:57.9 h	Charles Morton	7 April 1984		Charlotte Amalie, U.S. Virgin Islands	
5000 m	15:50.46 #	Dale Chappell	29 June 2014	Hayward Classic	Eugene, United States	
10,000 m	35:18.4 h	Jesse Mulcaire	13 May 1990		Basseterre, Saint Kitts and Nevis	
10 km (road)	32:12.5	Julian A. Ryan	16 June 1981		Basseterre, Saint Kitts and Nevis	
Half marathon	1:09:43	Trevor Belle	7 October 1988		Basseterre, Saint Kitts and Nevis	
Marathon	2:38:48	Jesse Mulcaire	5 November 1989	New York City Marathon	New York, United States	
110 m hurdles	13.95 (+1.1 m/s)	Akeem Chumney	18 June 2016	National Championships	Basseterre, Saint Kitts and Nevis	
400 m hurdles	50.95	Jahnaza Francis	29 May 2021	NCAA Division II Championships	Allendale, United States	
3000 m steeplechase						
High jump	2.28 m	Jermaine Francis	1 August 2018	CAC Games	Barranquilla, Colombia	
Pole vault	4.25 m	Adolphus Jones	9 May 2009		Nacogdoches, United States	
Long jump	7.59 m	Clyde Wilkinson	13 April 1996		Fresno, United States	
Triple jump	16.24 m	Vance Clarke	20 May 2000		Atlanta, United States	
Shot put	15.21 m	Dion Warde	8 February 2015		Basseterre, Saint Kitts and Nevis	
Discus throw	49.96 m	Dion Warde	9 May 2015		Basseterre, Saint Kitts and Nevis	
Hammer throw	48.81 m	Elvis Williams	30 April 2004		St. Charles, United States	
Javelin throw	69.34 m	Adrian Williams	6 May 2017	Texas Tech Masked Rider Open	Lubbock, United States	
Decathlon	7258 pts	Adolphus Jones	7–8 October 2010	Commonwealth Games	New Delhi, India	
Decathlon	100m / Long jump / Shot put / High jump / 400m / 110m H / Discus / Pole vault / Javelin / 1500m; 11.22 (+0.6 m/s) / 7.08 m (+0.6 m/s) / 13.47 m / 1.90 m / 49.46 / 14.89 (−0.3 m/s) / 38.23 m / 4.20 m / 43.23 m / 4:35.55					
20 km walk (road)						
50 km walk (road)						
4 × 100 m relay	38.41	Saint Kitts and Nevis; Lestrod Roland; Jason Rogers; Antoine Adams; Brijesh Lawrence	10 August 2012	Olympic Games	London, United Kingdom	
4 × 200 m relay	1:20.51	Saint Kitts and Nevis; Antoine Adams; Lestrod Roland; Brijesh Lawrence; Allistar Clarke	24 May 2014	IAAF World Relays	Nassau, Bahamas	
4 × 400 m relay	3:07.32	Saint Kitts and Nevis; Larry Inanga; Delwayne Delaney; Kadeem Smith; Melville Rogers	29 July 2006	Central American and Caribbean Games	Cartagena, Colombia	

=== Women ===
Event	Record	Athlete	Date	Meet	Place	Ref.
100 m	11.21 (+2.0 m/s)	Virgil Hodge	17 May 2008	MWC Championships	Fort Worth, United States	
100 m	11.19 X (−0.1 m/s)	Tameka Williams	11 June 2012	Moscow Challenge	Moscow, Russia	
100 m	11.18 X (+2.0 m/s)	Tameka Williams	28 April 2012	Texas State Bobcat Classic	San Marcos, United States	
200 m	22.68 (−1.0 m/s)	Virgil Hodge	25 May 2007	NCAA Midwest Regional Championships	Des Moines, United States	
200 m	22.45 X (+1.4 m/s)	Tameka Williams	3 June 2012	National Invitational and Club Championships	Basseterre, Saint Kitts and Nevis	
400 m	50.83	Tiandra Ponteen	11 June 2005	NCAA Division I Championships	Sacramento, United States	
800 m	2:12.85 (Note: by result source; 2:12.9 by World Athletics source)	Rosalie Pringle	22 June 2013		Vieux Fort, Saint Lucia	
1500 m	4:53.0 h	Vernice Wattley	8 July 1995		St. John's, Antigua and Barbuda	
3000 m	10:26.0 h	Elvina Huggins	25 June 1993		Basseterre, Saint Kitts and Nevis	
5000 m						
10,000 m						
Half marathon	1:32:16	Gabrielle Chappell	13 October 2019	Oxford Half Marathon	Oxford, United Kingdom	
Marathon	3:55:39	Vanessa Williams	20 September 2014	Independence Marathon	Charlestown, Saint Kitts and Nevis	
Marathon	3:33:23 (Note: per result source Chappell started for Malta)	Gabrielle Chappell	28 October 2018	Lausanne Marathon	Lausanne, Switzerland	
100 m hurdles	13.48 (+1.1 m/s) (Note: record set during heptathlon competition)	Kieshonna Brooks	9 May 2019	SEC Championships	Fayetteville, United States	
400 m hurdles	56.31	Reanda Richards	24 May 2019	NCAA East Preliminary Round	Jacksonville, United States	
3000 m steeplechase						
High jump	1.68 m	Bernice Morton	30 April 1995		Basseterre, Saint Kitts and Nevis	
High jump	1.68 m	Natalie Cozier	1 May 1999		St. Charles, United States	
Pole vault						
Long jump	6.67 m (−0.2 m/s)	Tanika Liburd	20 May 2010	Rice University All Comers Meet	Houston, United States	
Triple jump	12.67 m	Kristal Liburd	18 May 2019		Hobbs, United States	
Shot put	13.59 m	Touvia Arrindell	25 May 1996		St. George's, Grenada	
Discus throw	42.11 m	Stavia Lewis	17 June 2017	National Championships	Basseterre, Saint Kitts and Nevis	
Hammer throw						
Javelin throw	39.40 m	Tesril Nisbett	3 June 2012	National Invitational and Club Championships	Basseterre, Saint Kitts and Nevis	
Heptathlon	5338 pts	Kieshonna Brooks	11–12 May 2018	SEC Championships	Knoxville, United States	
Heptathlon	100m H / High jump / Shot put / 200m / Long jump / Javelin / 800m; 13.55 (+1.0 m/s) / 1.56 m / 11.44 m / 24.71 (+1.6 m/s) / 5.89 m (+1.6 m/s) / 35.07 m / 2:31.11					
20 km walk (road)						
50 km walk (road)						
4 × 100 m relay	43.53	Saint Kitts and Nevis; Tanika Liburd; Meritzer Williams; Tameka Williams; Virgil Hodge	4 July 2009	Central American and Caribbean Championships	Havana, Cuba	
4 × 200 m relay	1:42.17	Saint Kitts and Nevis; R Johnson; M Dias; Elricia Francis; Tamara Wigley-Brudy	2 August 1996		Kingston, Jamaica	
4 × 400 m relay	3:35.12	Saint Kitts and Nevis; Bernadeth Prentice; Diane Francis; Valma Bass; Tamara Wigley	2 August 1996	Olympic Games	Atlanta, United States	
Sprint medley relay (1,1,2,4)	1:51.73	Saint Kitts and Nevis; D Lescott-Lake; M Dias; V Phillip; D Delaney	9 April 1994		Kingston, Jamaica	

== Indoor ==
=== Men ===
Event	Record	Athlete	Date	Meet	Place	Ref.
50 m	5.79	Kim Collins	10 February 2009		Liévin, France	
55 m	6.24 A	Kim Collins	24 February 2001		Reno, United States	
60 m	6.47	Kim Collins	17 February 2015	Pedro's Cup	Łódź, Poland	
150 m	15.84	Kim Collins	25 January 2013	Aviva International Match	Glasgow, United Kingdom	
200 m	20.52	Kim Collins	10 March 2000	NCAA Division I Championships	Fayetteville, United States	
400 m	46.72	Warren Hazel	10 March 2017	NCAA Division I Championships	College Station, United States	
400 m	46.26 OT	Warren Hazel	11 February 2017		Nashville, United States	
800 m	1:51.0y A	Ezzard Wilson	22 January 1977		Pocatello, United States	
1500 m						
3000 m	9:43.12 A	Dale Chappell	6 March 2016	USATF Masters Championships	Albuquerque, United States	
60 m hurdles	8.46 (Note: record set during heptathlon competition)	Adolphus Jones	11 February 2010	ISU Classic	Ames, United States	
High jump	2.06 m (Note: record set during heptathlon competition)	Adolphus Jones	26 February 2010	Southland Conference Championships	Norman, United States	
Pole vault	4.45 m (Note: record set during heptathlon competition) (Note: outdoor mark ratified as absolute record)	Adolphus Jones	12 February 2010	ISU Classic	Ames, United States	
Long jump	7.45 m	Kevin Arthurton	15 February 2002		Lamoni, United States	
Triple jump	15.83 m	Vance Clarke	27 January 2001		Fayetteville, United States	
Shot put	13.10 m	Adolphus Jones	6 February 2010	Wichita State Shocker Quad	Wichita, United States	
Heptathlon	5475 pts	Adolphus Jones	26–27 February 2010	Southland Conference Championships	Norman, United States	
Heptathlon	60m / Long jump / Shot put / High jump / 60m H / Pole vault / 1000m; 7.19 / 7.05 m / 12.53 m / 2.06 m / 8.48 / 4.35 m / 2:51.13					
Heptathlon	5532 pts OT	Adolphus Jones	11–12 February 2010	ISU Classic	Ames, United States	
Heptathlon	60m / Long jump / Shot put / High jump / 60m H / Pole vault / 1000m; 7.25 / 7.03 m / 12.87 m / 2.04 m / 8.46 / 4.45 m / 2:46.61					
5000 m walk						
4 × 400 m relay						

=== Women ===
Event	Record	Athlete	Date	Meet	Place	Ref.
50 m	6.30+ (semifinal)	Tameka Williams	14 February 2012	Meeting Pas de Calais	Liévin, France	
50 m	6.30+ (final)	Tameka Williams	14 February 2012	Meeting Pas de Calais	Liévin, France	
60 m	7.24	Tameka Williams	12 February 2012	BW-Bank Meeting	Karlsruhe, Germany	
200 m	22.99	Virgil Hodge	9 March 2007	NCAA Division I Championships	Fayetteville, United States	
400 m	50.91	Tiandra Ponteen	12 March 2005	NCAA Division I Championships	Fayetteville, United States	
800 m	2:14.52	Reanda Richards	10 March 2017	New Balance Nationals	New York City, United States	
800 m	2:13.52	Rosalie Pringle	14 February 2015	Boilermaker Invitational	West Lafayette, United States	
1500 m						
3000 m						
55 m hurdles	8.25	Reanda Richards	28 January 2018	Ocean Breeze Invitational	Staten Island, United States	
60 m hurdles	8.32	Kieshonna Brooks	24 January 2020	Rod McCravy Memorial	Lexington, United States	
High jump	1.54 m	Natalie Cozier	2 February 2002		Normal, United States	
Pole vault						
Long jump	6.33 m	Tanika Liburd	9 February 2008		Houston, United States	
Triple jump	12.89 m (Note: outdoor mark ratified as absolute record)	Jessica Gilbert	24 February 2001		Princess Anne, United States	
Shot put	9.15 m	Natalie Cozier	16 February 2002		Lamoni, United States	
Pentathlon						
Pentathlon	60m H / High jump / Shot put / Long jump / 800m					
3000 m walk						
4 × 400 m relay						

== See also ==
- Saint Kitts and Nevis national athletics team
