= Athletics at the 2010 South American Games – Men's decathlon =

The men's decathlon event at the 2010 South American Games was held on 20–21 March.

== Medalists ==
Gold	Silver	Bronze
Diego Pereira de Araújo; Brazil	Pedro Lima; Brazil	Damián Benedetich; Argentina

== Records ==
Standing records prior to the 2010 South American Games
World record	Roman Šebrle	Czech Republic	9026	Götzis, Austria	27 May 2001
World leading	Keisuke Ushiro	Japan	7711	Hamilton, Australia	14 February 2010
South American record	Tito Steiner	Argentina	8291	Provo, United States	23 June 1983
South American U23 record	Pedro Ferreira da Silva Filho	Brazil	8266	Walnut, United States	23 April 1987

== Results ==
Results were published.

=== 100m ===
Rank	Athlete	Nationality	Reaction	Result	Points
1	Wuilmer Valor	Venezuela	0.169	11.11	836
2	Diego Pereira de Araújo	Brazil	0.191	11.19	819
3	Román Gastaldi	Argentina	0.187	11.20	817
4	Pedro Lima	Brazil	0.188	11.27	801
5	Victorio Gotuzzo	(Peru) Perú	0.193	11.29	797
6	Damián Benedetich	Argentina	0.269	11.33	789
7	Raúl Matajira	Colombia	0.165	11.46	761
8	José Lemos	Colombia	0.151	11.70	711
			Wind: +1.3 m/s		

=== Long jump ===
Rank	Athlete	Nationality	Attempt			Best result	Points
Rank	Athlete	Nationality	1	2	3	Best result	Points
1	Diego Pereira de Araújo	Brazil	x	7.31	x	7.31	888
2	Pedro Lima	Brazil	6.81	6.80	6.79	6.81	769
3	Victorio Gotuzzo	(Peru) Perú	6.66	6.74	6.62	6.74	753
4	Damián Benedetich	Argentina	6.73	6.67	6.56	6.73	750
5	Román Gastaldi	Argentina	6.61	x	x	6.61	723
6	José Lemos	Colombia	x	6.28	–	6.28	648
7	Wuilmer Valor	Venezuela	x	5.18	5.51	5.51	483
–	Raúl Matajira	Colombia				DNS	

=== Shot put ===
Rank	Athlete	Nationality	Attempt			Best result	Points
Rank	Athlete	Nationality	1	2	3	Best result	Points
1	José Lemos	Colombia	12.11	x	14.02	14.02	730
2	Damián Benedetich	Argentina	13.43	12.71	13.53	13.53	700
3	Román Gastaldi	Argentina	13.01	12.69	x	13.01	668
4	Victorio Gotuzzo	(Peru) Perú	x	12.57	x	12.57	641
5	Wuilmer Valor	Venezuela	11.34	11.80	11.11	11.80	594
6	Pedro Lima	Brazil	11.11	10.25	11.16	11.16	556
7	Diego Pereira de Araújo	Brazil	9.57	x	x	9.57	460
–	Raúl Matajira	Colombia				DNS	

=== High jump ===
Rank	Athlete	Nationality	Attempt																	Best result	Points
Rank	Athlete	Nationality	1.65	1.68	1.71	1.74	1.77	1.80	1.83	1.86	1.89	1.92	1.95	1.98	2.01	2.04	2.07	2.10	2.13	Best result	Points
1	Diego Pereira de Araújo	Brazil	–	–	–	–	–	–	–	–	–	–	xo	–	o	o	o	xxo	xxx	2.10	896
2	Pedro Lima	Brazil	–	–	–	–	–	xo	o	o	o	o	o	o	xxx					1.98	785
3	Román Gastaldi	Argentina	–	–	–	–	–	o	–	o	o	o	o	xxx						1.95	758
4	Victorio Gotuzzo	(Peru) Perú	–	–	–	–	–	–	o	xo	xxx									1.86	679
5	Damián Benedetich	Argentina	–	–	o	o	o	o	xxx											1.80	627
6	José Lemos	Colombia	–	–	–	o	o	xxx												1.77	602
7	Wuilmer Valor	Venezuela	xo	o	o	o	o	xxx												1.77	602
–	Raúl Matajira	Colombia																		DNS	

=== 400m ===
Rank	Athlete	Nationality	Reaction	Result	Points
1	Pedro Lima	Brazil	0.212	50.39	797
2	Diego Pereira de Araújo	Brazil	0.193	50.77	779
3	Victorio Gotuzzo	(Peru) Perú	0.206	50.96	771
4	Román Gastaldi	Argentina	0.184	51.65	740
5	Damián Benedetich	Argentina	0.204	51.88	730
6	Wuilmer Valor	Venezuela	0.193	52.71	694
7	José Lemos	Colombia	0.253	54.14	634
–	Raúl Matajira	Colombia		DNS	

=== 110m hurdles ===
Rank	Athlete	Nationality	Reaction	Result	Points
1	Diego Pereira de Araújo	Brazil	0.221	15.08	840
2	Pedro Lima	Brazil	0.186	15.40	802
3	Victorio Gotuzzo	(Peru) Perú	0.170	15.85	750
4	Damián Benedetich	Argentina	0.182	15.94	740
5	José Lemos	Colombia	0.200	16.00	733
–	Román Gastaldi	Argentina	0.186	DNF	0
–	Wuilmer Valor	Venezuela		DNS	
			Wind: -0.9 m/s		

=== Discus throw ===
Rank	Athlete	Nationality	Attempt			Best result	Points
Rank	Athlete	Nationality	1	2	3	Best result	Points
1	José Lemos	Colombia	x	43.29	x	43.29	732
2	Damián Benedetich	Argentina	39.72	x	39.62	39.72	659
3	Victorio Gotuzzo	(Peru) Perú	33.07	x	38.30	38.30	630
4	Pedro Lima	Brazil	x	33.32	37.02	37.02	604
5	Diego Pereira de Araújo	Brazil	35.36	32.60	31.27	35.36	571
–	Román Gastaldi	Argentina				DNS	
–	Wuilmer Valor	Venezuela				DNS	

=== Pole vault ===
Rank	Athlete	Nationality	Attempt																		Best result	Points
Rank	Athlete	Nationality	3.00	3.10	3.20	3.30	3.40	3.50	3.60	3.70	3.80	3.90	4.00	4.10	4.20	4.30	4.40	4.50	4.60	4.70	Best result	Points
1	Diego Pereira de Araújo	Brazil	–	–	–	–	–	–	–	–	–	–	o	–	o	–	o	–	xo	xxx	4.60	790
2	Pedro Lima	Brazil	–	–	–	–	–	–	–	–	–	xo	xo	–	o	–	o	–	xxx		4.40	731
3	Damián Benedetich	Argentina	–	–	o	–	o	–	o	o	xxx										3.70	535
4	Victorio Gotuzzo	(Peru) Perú	–	–	o	–	o	xxo	xxo	xo	xxx										3.70	535
5	José Lemos	Colombia	o	–	o	o	xxx														3.30	431

=== Javelin throw ===
Rank	Athlete	Nationality	Attempt			Best result	Points
Rank	Athlete	Nationality	1	2	3	Best result	Points
1	José Lemos	Colombia	60.99	59.85	64.48	64.48	805
2	Damián Benedetich	Argentina	55.33	54.77	54.41	55.33	668
3	Victorio Gotuzzo	(Peru) Perú	45.41	44.23	47.01	47.01	544
4	Diego Pereira de Araújo	Brazil	41.56	x	43.85	43.85	498
5	Pedro Lima	Brazil	39.55	40.32	41.87	41.87	469

=== 1500m ===
Rank	Athlete	Nationality	Result	Points
1	Victorio Gotuzzo	(Peru) Perú	4:34.41	716
2	Pedro Lima	Brazil	4:35.98	706
3	Diego Pereira de Araújo	Brazil	4:42.71	663
4	Damián Benedetich	Argentina	4:47.01	637
5	José Lemos	Colombia	5:30.72	396

=== Final standings ===
Rank	Athlete	Nationality	100m	LJ	SP	HJ	400m	110H	DT	PV	JT	1K5	Total
1st place, gold medalist(s)	Diego Pereira de Araújo	Brazil	819	888	460	896	779	840	571	790	498	663	7204
2nd place, silver medalist(s)	Pedro Lima	Brazil	801	769	556	785	797	802	604	731	469	706	7020
3rd place, bronze medalist(s)	Damián Benedetich	Argentina	789	750	700	627	730	740	659	535	668	637	6835
4	Victorio Gotuzzo	(Peru) Perú	797	753	641	679	771	750	630	535	544	716	6816
5	José Lemos	Colombia	711	648	730	602	634	733	732	431	805	396	6422
–	Román Gastaldi	Argentina	817	723	668	758	740	0					DNF
–	Wuilmer Valor	Venezuela	836	483	594	602	694						DNF
–	Raúl Matajira	Colombia	761										DNF

== See also ==
- 2010 South American Under-23 Championships in Athletics
