= Athletics at the 2011 Pan American Games – Men's decathlon =

Men's decathlon at the 2011 Pan American Games
- Venue: Telmex Athletics Stadium
- Dates: October 24–25
- Competitors: 14 from 9 nations

Medalists
Gold medal	Leonel Suárez	Cuba
Silver medal	Maurice Smith	Jamaica
Bronze medal	Yordanis García	Cuba

The men's decathlon event of the athletics events at the 2011 Pan American Games was held the 24 and 25 of October at the Telmex Athletics Stadium. The defending Pan American Games champion is Maurice Smith of the Jamaica.

== Records ==
Prior to this competition, the existing world and Pan American Games records were as follows:

World record	Roman Šebrle (CZE)	9026	Götzis, Austria	May 27, 2001
Pan American Games record	Maurice Smith (JAM)	8278	Rio de Janeiro, Brazil	July 24, 2007

== Qualification ==
Each National Olympic Committee (NOC) was able to enter up to two entrants providing they had met the minimum standard (6750) in the qualifying period (January 1, 2010 to September 14, 2011).

== Schedule ==
Date	Time	Round
October 24, 2011	13:00	100 metres
October 24, 2011	13:45	Long jump
October 24, 2011	15:10	Shot put
October 24, 2011	16:20	High jump
October 24, 2011	18:40	400 metres
October 25, 2011	13:00	110 metres hurdles
October 25, 2011	13:35	Discus throw
October 25, 2011	14:55	Pole vault
October 25, 2011	17:20	Javelin throw
October 25, 2011	18:40	1500 metres
October 25, 2011	18:40	Final standings

== Results ==
All distances shown are in meters:centimeters

KEY:	q	Fastest non-qualifiers	Q	Qualified	NR	National record	PB	Personal best	SB	Seasonal best

=== 100 metres ===
Rank	Heat	Athlete	Nationality	Result	Points	Notes
1	2	Román Gastaldi	Argentina	10.65	940	
2	2	Matthew Johnson	United States	10.68	933	
3	2	Yordanis García	Cuba	10.68	933	
4	2	Rodrigo Sagaon	Mexico	10.69	931	
5	1	Luiz Araújo	Brazil	10.82	901	
6	2	Geormi Jaramillo	Venezuela	10.85	894	
7	2	Maurice Smith	Jamaica	10.86	892	
8	2	Leonel Suárez	Cuba	11.01	858	
9	1	Marco Sanchez	Puerto Rico	11.04	852	
10	1	Gonzalo Barroilhet	Chile	11.06	847	
11	1	Claston Bernard	Jamaica	11.16	825	
12	1	Mark Jellison	United States	11.42	769	
13	1	Steven Marrero	Puerto Rico	11.57	738	
14	1	Alberto Zarate	Mexico	11.58	736	

=== Long jump ===
Rank	Group	Athlete	Nationality	Result	Points	Notes	Overall
1	B	Geormi Jaramillo	Venezuela	7.41	913	PB	1807
2	B	Leonel Suárez	Cuba	7.39	908		1766
3	B	Román Gastaldi	Argentina	7.37	903	PB	1843
4	A	Maurice Smith	Jamaica	7.36	900		1792
5	B	Mark Jellison	United States	7.30	886		1655
6	B	Matthew Johnson	United States	7.28	881		1814
7	A	Claston Bernard	Jamaica	7.09	835	PB	1660
8	B	Gonzalo Barroilhet	Chile	7.05	826		1673
9	A	Marco Sanchez	Puerto Rico	7.04	823		1675
10	A	Yordanis García	Cuba	6.78	762		1695
11	A	Alberto Zarate	Mexico	6.74	753		1489
12	A	Steven Marrero	Puerto Rico	6.63	727		1465
13	A	Rodrigo Sagaon	Mexico	6.55	709		1640
14	B	Luiz Araújo	Brazil	5.37	455		1356

=== Shot put ===
Rank	Athlete	Nationality	Result	Points	Notes	Overall
1	Maurice Smith	Jamaica	17.35	935	PB	2727
2	Geormi Jaramillo	Venezuela	14.96	787	PB	2594
3	Yordanis García	Cuba	14.81	778		2473
4	Leonel Suárez	Cuba	14.64	768	PB	2534
5	Gonzalo Barroilhet	Chile	14.21	741	PB	2414
6	Román Gastaldi	Argentina	14.01	729	PB	2572
7	Mark Jellison	United States	13.80	716	PB	2371
8	Claston Bernard	Jamaica	13.55	701	PB	2361
9	Marco Sanchez	Puerto Rico	13.29	685	PB	2360
10	Matthew Johnson	United States	13.23	681	PB	2495
11	Steven Marrero	Puerto Rico	13.05	670		2135
12	Alberto Zarate	Mexico	12.71	650		2139
13	Rodrigo Sagaon	Mexico	12.40	631		2271
	Luiz Araújo	Brazil	DNS			

=== High jump ===
Rank	Athlete	Nationality	Result	Points	Notes	Overall
1	Leonel Suárez	Cuba	2.08	878	PB	3412
2	Gonzalo Barroilhet	Chile	2.05	850	PB	3264
3	Yordanis García	Cuba	2.05	850		3323
4	Román Gastaldi	Argentina	1.99	794	PB	3366
5	Maurice Smith	Jamaica	1.99	794	PB	3521
6	Claston Bernard	Jamaica	1.96	767		3128
6	Marco Sanchez	Puerto Rico	1.96	767		3127
8	Mark Jellison	United States	1.96	767		3138
9	Steven Marrero	Puerto Rico	1.87	687	PB	2822
10	Alberto Zarate	Mexico	1.84	661		2800
11	Geormi Jaramillo	Venezuela	1.84	661	PB	3255
12	Rodrigo Sagaon	Mexico	1.69	536		2807
	Matthew Johnson	United States	NM	0		2495
	Luiz Araújo	Brazil	DNS			

=== 400 metres ===
Rank	Heat	Athlete	Nationality	Result	Points	Notes	Overall
1	2	Rodrigo Sagaon	Mexico	47.61	928	PB	3735
2	2	Geormi Jaramillo	Venezuela	48.30	895	PB	4150
3	1	Matthew Johnson	United States	48.80	871	PB	3366
4	2	Yordanis García	Cuba	48.84	869	PB	4192
5	2	Maurice Smith	Jamaica	49.26	849	PB	4370
6	2	Marco Sanchez	Puerto Rico	49.37	844	PB	3971
7	2	Román Gastaldi	Argentina	49.54	836	PB	4202
8	2	Leonel Suárez	Cuba	49.76	826		4238
9	1	Alberto Zarate	Mexico	51.02	768		3568
10	1	Gonzalo Barroilhet	Chile	51.08	765		4029
11	1	Steven Marrero	Puerto Rico	51.19	761	PB	3583
12	1	Claston Bernard	Jamaica	52.00	725	PB	3853
13	1	Mark Jellison	United States	53.17	674		3812
	1	Luiz Araújo	Brazil	DNS			

=== 110 metres hurdles ===
Rank	Heat	Athlete	Nationality	Result	Points	Notes	Overall
1	2	Maurice Smith	Jamaica	14.20	949		5319
2	2	Geormi Jaramillo	Venezuela	14.22	946	PB	5096
3	2	Yordanis García	Cuba	14.22	946	PB	5138
4	2	Gonzalo Barroilhet	Chile	14.23	945		4974
5	2	Leonel Suárez	Cuba	14.26	941	PB	5179
6	1	Mark Jellison	United States	14.49	912	PB	4724
7	1	Román Gastaldi	Argentina	14.71	885	PB	5087
8	1	Matthew Johnson	United States	14.77	878	PB	4244
9	2	Claston Bernard	Jamaica	14.92	859		4712
10	1	Rodrigo Sagaon	Mexico	15.23	822		4557
11	1	Alberto Zarate	Mexico	16.71	655		4223
	1	Steven Marrero	Puerto Rico	DNF	0		3583
	1	Marco Sanchez	Puerto Rico	DNF	0		3971
	2	Luiz Araújo	Brazil	DNS			

=== Discus throw ===
Rank	Athlete	Nationality	Result	Points	Notes	Overall
1	Maurice Smith	Jamaica	48.79	845	PB	6164
2	Steven Marrero	Puerto Rico	46.10	790	PB	4373
3	Leonel Suárez	Cuba	45.54	778		5957
4	Claston Bernard	Jamaica	43.79	742	PB	5454
5	Gonzalo Barroilhet	Chile	43.40	734	PB	5708
6	Román Gastaldi	Argentina	43.08	727	PB	5814
7	Geormi Jaramillo	Venezuela	41.99	705	PB	5801
8	Matthew Johnson	United States	41.48	695		4939
9	Rodrigo Sagaon	Mexico	40.80	681	PB	5238
10	Yordanis García	Cuba	40.20	669		5807
11	Mark Jellison	United States	38.69	638		5362
12	Alberto Zarate	Mexico	37.87	621		4844
	Luiz Araújo	Brazil	DNS			
	Marco Sanchez	Puerto Rico	DNS			

=== Pole vault ===
Rank	Athlete	Nationality	Result	Points	Notes	Overall
1	Gonzalo Barroilhet	Chile	5.30	1004		6712
2	Leonel Suárez	Cuba	4.80	849		6806
3	Yordanis García	Cuba	4.80	849		6656
4	Alberto Zarate	Mexico	4.50	760		5604
5	Maurice Smith	Jamaica	4.40	731		6895
6	Rodrigo Sagaon	Mexico	4.40	731		5969
7	Matthew Johnson	United States	4.30	702		5641
8	Claston Bernard	Jamaica	4.20	673		6127
9	Román Gastaldi	Argentina	4.20	673		6487
10	Geormi Jaramillo	Venezuela	3.90	590		6391
	Mark Jellison	United States	NM	0		5362
	Steven Marrero	Puerto Rico	NM	0		4373
	Luiz Araújo	Brazil	DNS			
	Marco Sanchez	Puerto Rico	DNS			

=== Javelin throw ===
Rank	Athlete	Nationality	Result	Points	Notes	Overall
1	Leonel Suárez	Cuba	72.19	923		7729
2	Yordanis García	Cuba	63.81	795		7451
3	Maurice Smith	Jamaica	59.57	731	PB	7626
4	Matthew Johnson	United States	59.20	726		6367
5	Alberto Zarate	Mexico	57.72	704		6308
6	Steven Marrero	Puerto Rico	56.51	685	PB	5058
7	Geormi Jaramillo	Venezuela	56.35	683	PB	7046
8	Gonzalo Barroilhet	Chile	56.24	681		7393
9	Román Gastaldi	Argentina	55.97	677	PB	7164
10	Claston Bernard	Jamaica	55.49	670		6797
11	Rodrigo Sagaon	Mexico	53.33	638	PB	6607
12	Mark Jellison	United States	51.31	608		5970
	Luiz Araújo	Brazil	DNS			
	Marco Sanchez	Puerto Rico	DNS			

=== 1500 metres ===
Rank	Athlete	Nationality	Result	Points	Notes	Overall
1	Alberto Zarate	Mexico	4:37.03	699		7007
2	Rodrigo Sagaon	Mexico	4:39.84	681	PB	7288
3	Román Gastaldi	Argentina	4:42.95	662		7826
4	Leonel Suárez	Cuba	4:45.78	644		8373
5	Yordanis García	Cuba	4:49.29	623		8074
6	Geormi Jaramillo	Venezuela	4:52.26	605	PB	7679
7	Gonzalo Barroilhet	Chile	4:54.34	593		7986
8	Maurice Smith	Jamaica	4:55.18	588		8214
9	Mark Jellison	United States	4:56.52	580		6550
10	Matthew Johnson	United States	4:59.60	562	PB	6929
11	Claston Bernard	Jamaica	5:20.11	449		7246
	Steven Marrero	Puerto Rico	DNF	0		5058

=== Final standings ===
Rank	Athlete	Nationality	Points	Notes
1st place, gold medalist(s)	Leonel Suárez	Cuba	8373	PR
2nd place, silver medalist(s)	Maurice Smith	Jamaica	8214	
3rd place, bronze medalist(s)	Yordanis García	Cuba	8074	
4	Gonzalo Barroilhet	Chile	7986	PB
5	Román Gastaldi	Argentina	7826	PB
6	Geormi Jaramillo	Venezuela	7679	PB
7	Rodrigo Sagaon	Mexico	7288	PB
8	Claston Bernard	Jamaica	7246	
9	Alberto Zarate	Mexico	7007	PB
10	Matthew Johnson	United States	6929	
11	Mark Jellison	United States	6550	
12	Steven Marrero	Puerto Rico	5058	
	Marco Sanchez	Puerto Rico	DNF	
	Luiz Araújo	Brazil	DNF	
