= 2003 Leeward Islands Junior Championships in Athletics =

III Leeward Islands Junior/Youth Championships
- Dates: May 31–June 1
- Host city: Road Town, Tortola, British Virgin Islands
- Venue: A. O. Shirley Recreation Ground
- Level: Junior and Youth
- Events: 44 (12 junior boys, 12 junior girls, 10 youth boys, 10 youth girls)
- Participation: 164 athletes from 7 nations

The 2003 Leeward Islands Junior Championships in Athletics took place on May 31–June 1, 2003. The event was held at the A. O. Shirley Recreation Ground in Road Town, Tortola, British Virgin Islands. A detailed report was published.

A total of 44 events were contested, 22 by boys and 22 by girls.

== Medal summary ==
Complete results were published.

=== Boys (U-20) ===
Event	Gold		Silver		Bronze	
100 metres	Daniel Bailey; Antigua and Barbuda	10.62	Aliston Potter; British Virgin Islands	10.96	Bernell Smithen; U.S. Virgin Islands	11.13
200 metres	Daniel Bailey; Antigua and Barbuda	22.29	Chet Gomes; Antigua and Barbuda	22.34	Kevin Fahie; British Virgin Islands	22.63
400 metres	Kevin Fahie; British Virgin Islands	50.64	Bernell Smithen; U.S. Virgin Islands	50.82	Chet Gomes; Antigua and Barbuda	51.44
800 metres	Jamil Nelson; Antigua and Barbuda	1:58.80	Jerome Toussaint; Saint Kitts	2:01.34	Adolphus Jones; Saint Kitts	2:12.83
1500 metres	Jamil Nelson; Antigua and Barbuda	4:13.42	Jerome Toussaint; Saint Kitts	4:20.12	Obrien Huggins; Saint Kitts	4:56.85
5000 metres^{†}	Jamil Nelson; Antigua and Barbuda	17:25.5 (ht)	Obrien Huggins; Saint Kitts	18:16.2 (ht)	Michael Scott; Antigua and Barbuda	18:46.2 (ht)
High jump	James Grayman; Antigua and Barbuda	2.00	Adolphus Jones; Saint Kitts	1.90	Tamasa Samuels; Nevis	1.80
Long jump	Ayata Joseph; Antigua and Barbuda	7.12	Donville Eddy; Saint Kitts	6.51	Adolphus Jones; Saint Kitts	6.42
Triple jump^{†}	Ayata Joseph; Antigua and Barbuda	14.79	Adolphus Jones; Saint Kitts	12.99	Brandon Joseph; Antigua and Barbuda	12.98
Shot put	Eric Mathias; British Virgin Islands	14.02	Romeo Brown; Sint Maarten	12.51	Lesroy Brown; Saint Kitts	11.05
Discus throw	Eric Mathias; British Virgin Islands	48.07	Romeo Brown; Sint Maarten	33.16	Kyle Francis; British Virgin Islands	30.11
Javelin throw	Romeo Brown; Sint Maarten	40.85	Adolphus Jones; Saint Kitts	39.84	James Grayman; Antigua and Barbuda	38.90

^{†}: Open event for both U20 and U17 athletes.

=== Girls (U-20) ===
Event	Gold		Silver		Bronze	
100 metres	Chandora Codrington; Antigua and Barbuda	12.02	Nolise Henry; Saint Kitts	12.60	Surine Mitcham; Saint Kitts	12.87
200 metres	Chandora Codrington; Antigua and Barbuda	25.19	Kelsa Mason; Saint Kitts	26.54	Surine Mitcham; Saint Kitts	26.81
400 metres	Janil Williams; Antigua and Barbuda	1:01.15	Kelsa Mason; Saint Kitts	1:01.19	Nerissa Pelle; Antigua and Barbuda	1:01.59
800 metres	Janil Williams; Antigua and Barbuda	2:26.84	Calisa Maloney; Antigua and Barbuda	2:28.15	Sonny Eugene; U.S. Virgin Islands	2:37.71
1500 metres	Janil Williams; Antigua and Barbuda	5:17.59	Calisia Maloney; Antigua and Barbuda	5:19.55	Roseline Coleman; Sint Maarten	5:58.44
3000 metres^{†}	Janil Williams; Antigua and Barbuda	11:42.29	Romancia Arthurton; Nevis	12:20.71	Tamika Butler; Antigua and Barbuda	13:00.00
High jump	Zelma Mills; Nevis	1.50	Antoinette Huggins; Saint Kitts; Tanaysha Henry; British Virgin Islands	1.50		
Long jump	Rosalie Glasford; Saint Kitts	5.37	Antoinette Huggins; Saint Kitts	4.93	Zelma Mills; Nevis	4.88
Triple jump^{†}	Rosalie Glasford; Saint Kitts	11.37	Patrice Davis; Antigua and Barbuda	10.29	Deon Marquis; British Virgin Islands	9.95
Shot put	Zelma Mills; Nevis	9.92	Antoinette Huggins; Saint Kitts	8.40	Latoya George; British Virgin Islands	8.34
Discus throw	Latoya George; British Virgin Islands	25.77	Teandra Moore; Antigua and Barbuda	25.40	Lena Scotland; Sint Maarten	24.29
Javelin throw	Zelma Mills; Nevis	23.80	Antoinette Huggins; Saint Kitts	23.17	Donna Leonard; British Virgin Islands	21.71

^{†}: Open event for both U20 and U17 athletes.

=== Boys (U-17) ===
Event	Gold		Silver		Bronze	
100 metres	Adino Greenaway; Antigua and Barbuda	11.18	Claude Paul; Sint Maarten	11.21	Mark Kendall; British Virgin Islands	11.25
200 metres	Adino Greenaway; Antigua and Barbuda	22.75	Mark Kendall; British Virgin Islands	22.85	Whitley Williams; Saint Kitts	23.59
400 metres	Darnel Allen; Saint Kitts	52.1 (ht)	Lenniel Warner; Saint Kitts	52.2 (ht)	Kimon Lewis; British Virgin Islands	53.9 (ht)
800 metres	Ervin Woolard; Saint Kitts	2:06.77	Michael Scott; Antigua and Barbuda	2:08.25	Leron Chambers; Saint Kitts	2:11.12
1500 metres	Erwin Woolard; Saint Kitts	4:30.97	Leron Chambers; Saint Kitts	4:30.99	Michael Scott; Antigua and Barbuda	4:50.12
High jump	Kimon Lewis; British Virgin Islands	1.80	McKenzie Baltimore; British Virgin Islands	1.70	Lenniel Warner; Saint Kitts	1.70
Long jump	Kenyatta Burt; Saint Kitts	6.39	Claude Paul; Sint Maarten	6.39	Lenniel Warner; Saint Kitts	6.29
Shot put	Lenbirch Williams; Saint Kitts	13.59	Devon Farrel; Saint Kitts	12.70	Kejal Reede; Nevis	10.57
Discus throw	Lenbirch Williams; Saint Kitts	35.69	Julius Manners; Nevis	28.88	Kejal Reede; Nevis	26.68
Javelin throw	Kenyatta Burt; Saint Kitts	36.50	Julius Manners; Nevis	33.59	Kejal Reede; Nevis	32.46

=== Girls (U-17) ===
Event	Gold		Silver		Bronze	
100 metres	Anika Jno Baptiste; Antigua and Barbuda	11.9 (ht)	Marecia Pemberton; Saint Kitts	12.5 (ht)	Malaika Anthony; Saint Kitts	12.5 (ht)
200 metres	Anika Jno Baptiste; Antigua and Barbuda	25.51	Amanda Edwards; Antigua and Barbuda	26.47	Curlee Gumbs; Anguilla	26.51
400 metres	Amanda Edwards; Antigua and Barbuda	59.18	Tifa Lee; U.S. Virgin Islands	1:00.49	Malaika Anthony; Saint Kitts	1:01.93
800 metres	Maria Appleton; Antigua and Barbuda	2:25.88	Kerish Richardson; Saint Kitts	2:26.00	Cleopatra Perry; Nevis	2:29.30
1500 metres	Kerish Richardson; Saint Kitts	5:12.2 (ht)	Maria Appleton; Antigua and Barbuda	5:17.4 (ht)	Romanica Arthurton; Nevis	5:20.8 (ht)
High jump	Melissa Allen; Nevis	1.50	Shara Proctor; Anguilla	1.50	Aquilyah Smith; Saint Kitts	1.40
Long jump	Shara Proctor; Anguilla	5.64	Melissa Allen; Nevis	5.11	Kimmoy Henry; Saint Kitts	4.93
Shot put	Lisa Browne; Nevis	9.93	Kimmoy Henry; Saint Kitts	9.60	Jamilla Morton; Saint Kitts	9.55
Discus throw	Jamila Morton; Saint Kitts	26.80	Jasmaine Symons; Nevis	25.45	Shara Proctor; Anguilla	24.40
Javelin throw	Amanda Edwards; Antigua and Barbuda	35.27	Jasmaine Symons; Nevis	25.25	Kimmoy Henry; Saint Kitts	22.13

== Medal table (unofficial) ==
* Host nation (British Virgin Islands)

Rank	Nation	Gold	Silver	Bronze	Total
1	Antigua and Barbuda	21	8	7	36
2	Saint Kitts	11	20	16	47
3	Nevis	5	6	7	18
4	British Virgin Islands*	5	4	7	16
5	Sint Maarten	1	4	2	7
6	Anguilla	1	1	2	4
7	U.S. Virgin Islands	0	2	2	4
Totals (7 entries)		44	45	43	132

== Team trophies ==
The scores for the team trophy were published.

The host country is highlighted in lavender blue

Rank	Nation	Points
1st place, gold medalist(s)	Saint Kitts	282.5
2	Antigua and Barbuda	243
3	British Virgin Islands	135.5
4	Nevis	114
5	Sint Maarten	48
6	Anguilla	23
7	U.S. Virgin Islands	21

== Participation ==
According to an unofficial count, 164 athletes from 7 countries participated.

- Anguilla (8)
- Antigua and Barbuda (30)
- British Virgin Islands (28)
- Nevis (27)
- Saint Kitts (38)
- Sint Maarten (23)
- U.S. Virgin Islands (10)
