= 2008 Hypo-Meeting =

The 34th edition of the annual Hypo-Meeting took place on May 31 and June 1, 2008 in Götzis, Austria. The track and field competition, featuring a decathlon (men) and a heptathlon (women) event was part of the 2008 IAAF World Combined Events Challenge.

== Men's Decathlon ==
=== Schedule ===
May 31
1. 100 m
2. Long Jump
3. Shot Put
4. High Jump
5. 400 m

June 1
6. 110 m hurdles
7. Discus Throw
8. Pole Vault
9. Javelin Throw
10. 1,500 m

=== Records ===
World Record	Roman Šebrle (CZE)	9026	May 27, 2001	Götzis, Austria
Event Record	Roman Šebrle (CZE)	9026	May 27, 2001	Götzis, Austria

=== Results ===
The highest mark recorded in each event is highlighted in yellow

Rank	Athlete	Decathlon										Points
Rank	Athlete	1	2	3	4	5	6	7	8	9	10	Points
1	Dmitriy Karpov (KAZ)	10,85	7.23	16.49	2.06	48,64	14,14	49.98	5.30	50.62	4.37,93	8504
2	Aleksey Sysoyev (RUS)	10,86	7.01	15.49	2.03	49,10	14,64	54.08	5.10	64.22	4.38,82	8497
3	Aleksandr Pogorelov (RUS)	11,06	7.53	16.54	2.09	51,57	14,30	50.17	4.80	65.57	4.53,94	8381
4	Leonel Suárez (CUB)	11,23	7.16	13.89	2.09	48,37	14,42	44.67	4.60	70.64	4.16,70	8366
5	Maurice Smith (JAM)	10,86	7.30	16.50	1.94	48,82	14,05	52.77	4.70	53.54	4.37,38	8332
6	Pascal Behrenbruch (GER)	11,00	6.96	16.58	2.03	49,32	14,13	47.29	4.50	66.44	4.45,49	8242
7	Arthur Abele (GER)	10,83	7.24	13.17	1.97	48,51	13,94	40.21	4.90	60.08	4.15,77	8220
8	Aleksey Drozdov (RUS)	11,13	7.78	15.97	2.09	51,61	14,92	47.42	4.70	64.22	4.53,86	8208
9	Eugène Martineau (NED)	11,15	7.23	13.95	1.94	49,49	14,71	44.77	5.00	67.00	4.28,82	8161
10	Massimo Bertocchi (CAN)	10,99	7.34	14.10	1.91	48,96	14,07	44.32	5.20	47.89	4.47,70	7959
11	Nicklas Wiberg (SWE)	11,05	7.06	14.18	2.00	49,18	14,68	41.39	3.80	72.54	4.25,93	7917
12	Mikalai Shubianok (BLR)	11,38	6.81	15.00	2.06	49,81	14,53	43.34	4.40	59.96	4.28,17	7884
13	Carlos Chinin (BRA)	10,98	7.37	12.93	2.09	49,33	14,57	37.72	4.30	55.42	4.33,32	7778
14	David Gervasi (SUI)	11,30	6.94	14.72	2.00	50,92	14,58	38.47	5.00	55.86	4.38,07	7755
15	Hans Van Alphen (BEL)	11,24	7.08	14.19	1.82	49,30	14,92	43.89	4.20	57.90	4.24,64	7634
16	Jacob Minah (GER)	10,78	7.36	14.26	1.97	48,05	14,49	42.01	4.90	50.10	DNF	7325
—	Edgards Erinš (LAT)	11,26	6.56	12.71	1.82	DNF	14,97	42.03	NM	52.73	—	DNF
—	Yordanis García (CUB)	10,91	6.66	14.72	2.00	51,65	—	—	—	—	—	DNF
—	Josef Karas (CZE)	11,11	7.24	13.73	1.91	51,40	15,18	46.28	NM	43.01	—	DNF
—	Norman Müller (GER)	11,16	NM	13.84	1.88	48.45	14,68	40.89	4.40	—	—	DNF
—	André Niklaus (GER)	11,24	7.24	13.41	1.97	50.16	14,46	43.87	5.20	53.63	—	DNF
—	Arkady Vasilyev (RUS)	11,25	7.20	14.68	1.94	49.02	14,60	44.54	4.80	55.28	—	DNF

== Women's Heptathlon ==
=== Schedule ===
May 31
1. 100 m hurdles
2. High Jump
3. Shot Put
4. 200 m

June 1
5. Long Jump
6. Javelin Throw
7. 800 m

=== Records ===
World Record	Jackie Joyner-Kersee (USA)	7291	September 24, 1988	Seoul, South Korea
Event Record	Sabine Braun (GER)	6985	May 31, 1992	Götzis, Austria

=== Results ===
The highest mark recorded in each event is highlighted in yellow

Rank	Athlete	Heptathlon							Points
Rank	Athlete	1	2	3	4	5	6	7	Points
1	Tatyana Chernova (RUS)	13.60	1.73	13.13	23.86	6.78	53.51	2:12.11	6618
2	Lyudmila Blonska (UKR)	13.49	1.79	14.45	24.28	6.66	48.29	2:15.34	6570
3	Anna Bogdanova (RUS)	13.35	1.88	14.64	24.42	6.49	37.65	2:14.76	6452
4	Karolina Tyminska (POL)	13.86	1.70	14.82	23.42	6.45	36.89	2:06.73	6351
5	Olga Kurban (RUS)	13.39	1.79	13.54	23.98	6.44	40.98	2:15.12	6343
6	Marina Goncharova (RUS)	13.92	1.73	13.83	24.69	6.38	47.47	2:10.31	6319
7	Lilli Schwarzkopf (GER)	13.98	1.76	13.86	25.36	6.21	54.35	2:13.94	6316
8	Julia Mächtig (GER)	14.33	1.79	14.82	24.62	6.41	45.03	2:16.52	6282
9	Nataliya Dobrynska (UKR)	14.15	1.76	16.35	25.49	6.27	46.90	2:17.73	6268
10	Austra Skujytė (LTU)	14.62	1.79	16.67	25.46	6.21	46.51	2:17.98	6235
11	Ida Marcussen (NOR)	14.54	1.70	13.96	24.94	6.22	52.95	2:11.92	6213
12	Antoinette Nana Djimou Ida (FRA)	13.66	1.73	13.90	24.61	6.03	48.73	2:16.88	6189
13	Jennifer Oeser (GER)	13.83	1.79	13.82	24.90	6.08	44.74	2:13.78	6189
14	Sonja Kesselschläger (GER)	13.75	1.79	14.33	25.33	6.25	41.24	2:17.15	6134
15	Jessica Samuelsson (SWE)	13.96	1.73	13.56	24.28	6.23	37.44	2:09.11	6111
16	Olga Levenkova (RUS)	13.97	1.73	12.74	25.10	6.28	48.90	2:16.97	6103
17	Yvonne Wisse (NED)	13.67	1.73	13.36	24.07	6.03	37.53	2:09.16	6098
18	Christine Schulz (GER)	13.73	1.76	13.95	25.31	5.95	44.51	2:15.39	6070
19	Denisa Šcerbová (CZE)	13.49	1.76	11.42	23.97	6.34	34.89	2:11.70	6053
20	Sara Aerts (BEL)	13.59	1.73	13.26	24.49	6.20	40.30	2:17.62	6048
21	Jessica Zelinka (CAN)	13.50	1.67	13.73	24.00	5.92	41.29	2:15.03	6034
22	Linda Züblin (SUI)	13.91	1.67	12.84	24.73	6.07	50.34	2:18.61	6018
23	Gretchen Quintana (CUB)	13.88	1.61	13.47	24.30	5.51	33.10	2:20.30	5510
24	Simone Oberer (SUI)	13.87	1.76	12.63	25.67	6.27	39.39	DNF	5044
25	Jolanda Keizer (NED)	14.46	1.79	14.08	25.08	NM	41.04	2:24.06	5014
—	Jessica Ennis (GBR)	13.36	1.85	13.52	23.59	—	—	—	DNF
—	Svetlana Sokolova (RUS)	14.24	1.70	13.15	25.26	NM	—	—	DNF

== See also ==
- Athletics at the 2008 Summer Olympics – Men's decathlon
- Athletics at the 2008 Summer Olympics – Women's heptathlon
