= Carlos Chinin =

Brazilian decathlete (born 1985)

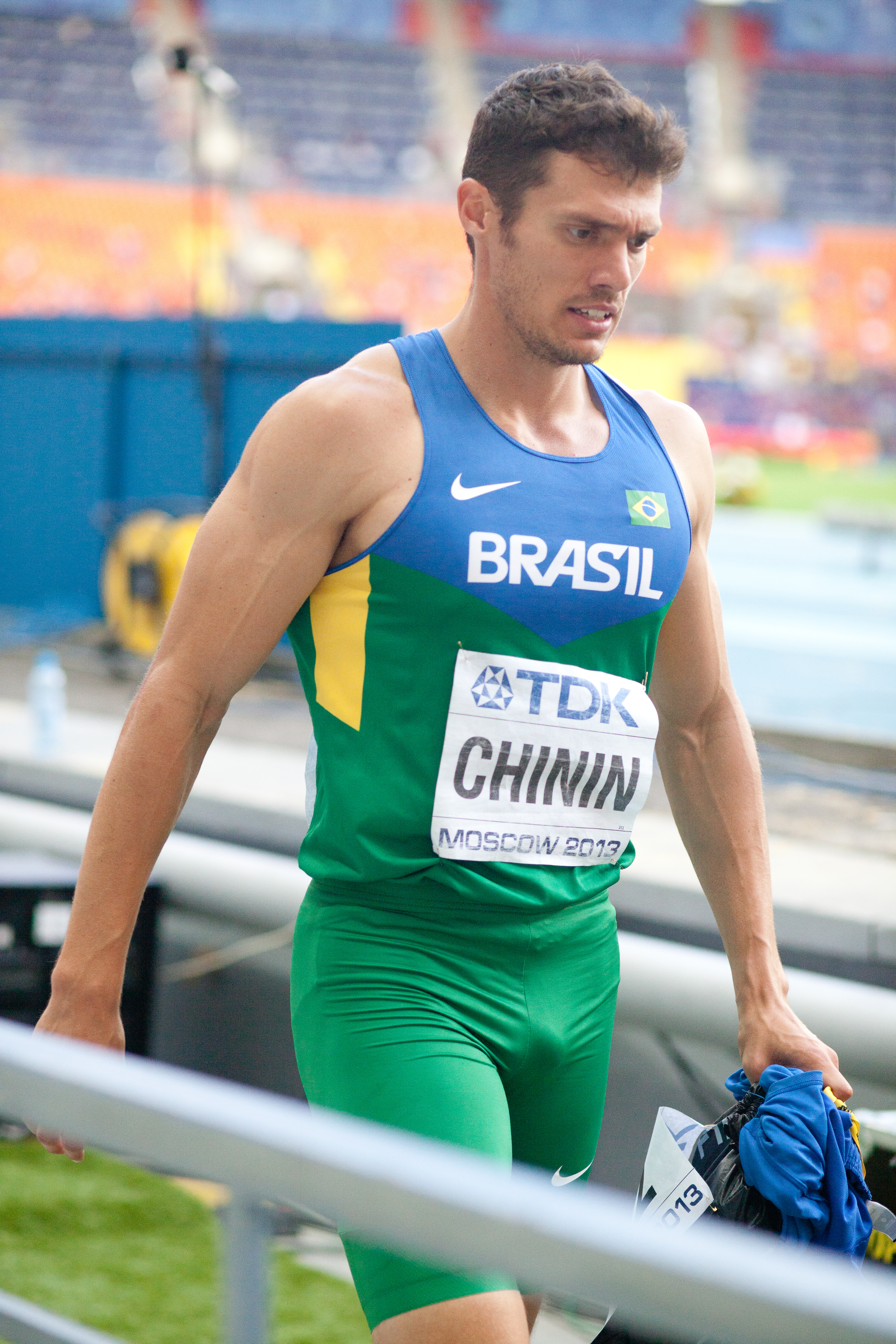
- Chinin at the 2013 World Championships in Athletics

Personal information
- Full name: Carlos Eduardo Bezerra Chinin
- Born: 3 May 1985 (age 41) São Paulo, São Paulo, Brazil
- Height: 1.95 m (6 ft 5 in)
- Weight: 83 kg (183 lb; 13.1 st)

Sport
- Country: Brazil
- Sport: Track and field athletics
- Event: Decathlon

Achievements and titles
- Personal bests: Decathlon: 8393 pts SA (Brazilian Championships 2013)
Medal record
Men's athletics
Representing Brazil
Pan American Games
Bronze medal – third place	2007 Rio de Janeiro	Decathlon
Universiade
Bronze medal – third place	2007 Bangkok	Decathlon

Carlos Eduardo Bezerra Chinin (born 3 May 1985 in São Paulo) is a decathlete from Brazil.

At the 2007 Pan American Games in Rio de Janeiro, the first Chinin's Pan, he won the bronze medal in the decathlon. He finished the first day in the second place, dropped to fourth after nine races, but made a startling rise in the last race, the 1500 m, finishing with 7977 points and medal.

At the 2007 Universiade in Bangkok, Chinin won a bronze medal, making 7920 points.

At the Olympic Games Beijing 2008 in China, Chinin suffered a spasm in the buttocks during the second step of the decathlon (long jump), and had difficulties in the other competitions. He had bad performances in the shot put, high jump and 400 meter. Then, on the second day, did not dispute the 110 meter hurdles, and was eliminated

In June 2013, Chinin broke the South American record in the decathlon, with the mark of 8393 points. Thus, he qualified for the 2013 World Championships in Athletics, obtaining the third best mark this year's World Ranking. The South American record earlier belonged to Luiz Alberto de Araujo, who had reached 8,276 points in 2012.

At the 2013 World Championships in Moscow, he made great competition until the ninth and penultimate round, where he was in fifth place, near the bronze medal. Chinin finished in sixth place with 8388 points, 5 of his South American record. Chinin hit 4 personal bests (10s78 in the 100m, 14s05 in the 110m hurdles, 5.10m in the pole vault and 59.98 m in the Javelin) and made the best campaign of a Brazilian in the World Championships on decathlon.

== Achievements ==
Year	Competition	Venue	Position	Event	Notes
Representing Brazil
2004	South American U23 Championships	Barquisimeto, Venezuela	—	Decathlon	DNF
2005	South American Championships	Cali, Colombia	4th	Decathlon	7307 pts
2006	South American Championships	Tunja, Colombia	1st	Decathlon	7208 pts
2006	South American U23 Championships / South American Games	Buenos Aires, Argentina	1st	Decathlon	7253 pts
2007	Pan American Games	Rio de Janeiro, Brazil	3rd	Decathlon	7977 pts
2007	World Championships	Osaka, Japan	–	Decathlon	DNF
2007	Universiade	Bangkok, Thailand	3rd	Decathlon	7920 pts
2008	Hypo-Meeting	Götzis, Austria	13th	Decathlon	7778 pts
2008	Olympic Games	Beijing, China	–	Decathlon	DNF
2009	South American Championships	Lima, Peru	1st	Decathlon	7474 pts
2013	World Championships	Moscow, Russia	6th	Decathlon	8388 pts
