= Athletics at the 2007 Summer Universiade – Men's decathlon =

The men's decathlon competition at the 2007 Summer Universiade took place on 12 August and 13 August 2007 in the Main Stadium at the Thammasat University in Bangkok, Thailand.

== Medalists ==
Gold	Jacob Minah; Germany (GER)
Silver	Hans Van Alphen; Belgium (BEL)
Bronze	Carlos Eduardo Chinin; Brazil (BRA)

== Records ==
World record	Roman Šebrle (CZE)	9026	27 May 2001	Götzis, Austria
Event record	Roman Šebrle (CZE)	8380	30 August 1997	Catania, Italy

== Results ==
=== 100 metres ===
Wind:
Heat 1: -0.6 m/s, Heat 2: -0.9 m/s, Heat 3: -1.2 m/s

Rank	Heat	Name	Nationality	Time	Points	Notes
1	1	Jacob Minah	Germany	10.75	917	
2	3	Oleksiy Kasyanov	Ukraine	10.77	912	
3	3	Carlos Eduardo Chinin	Brazil	11.00	861	
4	2	Aliaksandr Korzun	Belarus	11.02	856	
5	1	Aleksandr Zyabrev	Russia	11.04	852	
5	2	Alexis Chivás	Cuba	11.04	852	
7	2	Jamie Adjetey-Nelson	Canada	11.06	847	
8	2	Hans Van Alphen	Belgium	11.16	825	
9	3	Mattias Cerlati	France	11.18	821	
10	1	Ali Hazer	Lebanon	11.30	795	
11	1	Iván Scolfaro da Silva	Brazil	11.35	784	
12	1	David Gervasi	Switzerland	11.38	778	
13	3	Mikhail Logvinenko	Russia	11.39	776	
14	2	Boonkete Chalon	Thailand	11.41	771	
15	3	Zhang Yu	China	11.43	767	
16	2	Igor Šarčević	Serbia	11.52	748	
16	3	Mikalai Shubianok	Belarus	11.52	748	
18	1	Mohd Ikhwan Nor	Malaysia	11.61	730	
19	1	Zhu Hengjun	China	11.63	725	
20	3	Álvaro Contreras	Spain	11.71	709	
21	1	Päärn Brauer	Estonia	11.77	697	
22	2	Meelis Kosk	Estonia	11.78	695	

=== Long jump ===
Rank	Group	Athlete	Nationality	#1	#2	#3	Result	Points	Notes	Overall
1	A	Jacob Minah	Germany	x	x	7.87	7.87	1027		1944
2	A	Alexis Chivás	Cuba	x	7.28	7.50	7.50	935		1787
3	A	Hans Van Alphen	Belgium	7.49	5.25	x	7.49	932		1757
4	A	Oleksiy Kasyanov	Ukraine	x	7.46	x	7.46	925		1837
4	A	Carlos Eduardo Chinin	Brazil	x	x	7.46	7.46	925		1786
6	B	Álvaro Contreras	Spain	6.99w	x	7.20	7.20	862		1571
7	B	David Gervasi	Switzerland	7.01	7.07	7.18	7.18	857		1635
8	A	Jamie Adjetey-Nelson	Canada	x	7.03	7.17	7.17	854		1701
9	A	Aleksandr Zyabrev	Russia	6.94w	7.08	7.15	7.15	850		1702
10	B	Aliaksandr Korzun	Belarus	x	7.01w	x	7.01w	816		1672
11	B	Mikhail Logvinenko	Russia	6.91	6.99	6.92	6.99	811		1587
12	B	Iván Scolfaro da Silva	Brazil	x	6.98	6.90	6.98	809		1593
13	A	Zhang Yu	China	6.93	6.79	–	6.93	797		1564
14	A	Mohd Ikhwan Nor	Malaysia	x	6.53	6.85	6.85	778		1508
15	A	Mikalai Shubianok	Belarus	x	6.81	6.84	6.84	776		1524
16	B	Igor Šarčević	Serbia	6.58	x	6.80	6.80	767		1515
17	B	Ali Hazer	Lebanon	6.61	6.47	6.67w	6.67w	736		1531
18	A	Meelis Kosk	Estonia	6.66	6.44	x	6.66	734		1429
19	B	Boonkete Chalon	Thailand	6.46	x	6.62	6.62	725		1496
20	B	Päärn Brauer	Estonia	3.20	–	–	3.20	90		787
	B	Mattias Cerlati	France	x	x	x	NM	0		821
	B	Zhu Hengjun	China	x	–	–	NM	0		725

=== Shot put ===
Rank	Group	Athlete	Nationality	#1	#2	#3	Result	Points	Notes	Overall
1	B	Hans Van Alphen	Belgium	14.71	x	15.39	15.39	814		2571
2	B	Alexis Chivás	Cuba	14.84	14.83	15.16	15.16	800		2587
3	A	David Gervasi	Switzerland	15.13	14.79	x	15.13	798		2433
4	A	Mikalai Shubianok	Belarus	13.92	x	14.90	14.90	784		2308
5	B	Jamie Adjetey-Nelson	Canada	13.56	13.51	14.76	14.76	775		2476
6	A	Aleksandr Zyabrev	Russia	x	14.29	14.06	14.29	746		2448
7	A	Mattias Cerlati	France	14.10	x	14.26	14.26	744		1565
8	A	Oleksiy Kasyanov	Ukraine	13.57	13.92	x	13.92	723		2560
9	B	Jacob Minah	Germany	13.21	13.80	x	13.80	716		2660
10	A	Iván Scolfaro da Silva	Brazil	13.61	13.58	x	13.61	704		2297
11	B	Igor Šarčević	Serbia	13.39	13.61	x	13.61	704		2219
12	B	Meelis Kosk	Estonia	13.45	13.24	x	13.45	695		2124
13	B	Carlos Eduardo Chinin	Brazil	x	13.15	12.95	13.15	676		2462
14	B	Aliaksandr Korzun	Belarus	12.39	12.04	12.97	12.97	665		2337
15	B	Mikhail Logvinenko	Russia	12.53	12.75	12.79	12.79	654		2241
16	A	Álvaro Contreras	Spain	12.76	12.72	12.53	12.76	653		2224
17	B	Boonkete Chalon	Thailand	11.53	x	12.16	12.16	616		2112
18	A	Mohd Ikhwan Nor	Malaysia	11.46	x	11.43	11.46	574		2082
19	A	Zhang Yu	China	x	11.13	x	11.13	554		2118
20	A	Ali Hazer	Lebanon	10.32	x	10.74	10.74	530		2061
	A	Päärn Brauer	Estonia				DNS	0		DNF
	B	Zhu Hengjun	China				DNS	0		DNF

=== High jump ===
Rank	Group	Athlete	Nationality	Result	Points	Notes	Overall
1	B	Carlos Eduardo Chinin	Brazil	2.13	925		3387
2	A	Zhang Yu	China	2.01	813		2931
3	A	Mattias Cerlati	France	1.98	785		2350
3	B	Álvaro Contreras	Spain	1.98	785		3009
3	B	David Gervasi	Switzerland	1.98	785		3218
6	A	Mikalai Shubianok	Belarus	1.95	758		3066
6	A	Mikhail Logvinenko	Russia	1.95	758		2999
6	B	Aliaksandr Korzun	Belarus	1.95	758		3095
9	B	Oleksiy Kasyanov	Ukraine	1.92	731		3291
10	B	Jacob Minah	Germany	1.92	731		3391
11	A	Meelis Kosk	Estonia	1.89	705		2829
12	A	Igor Šarčević	Serbia	1.89	705		2924
13	A	Jamie Adjetey-Nelson	Canada	1.86	679		3155
13	A	Iván Scolfaro da Silva	Brazil	1.86	679		2976
13	B	Aleksandr Zyabrev	Russia	1.86	679		3127
13	B	Alexis Chivás	Cuba	1.86	679		3266
17	A	Hans Van Alphen	Belgium	1.83	653		3224
18	A	Boonkete Chalon	Thailand	1.80	627		2739
19	A	Ali Hazer	Lebanon	1.80	627		2688
	B	Mohd Ikhwan Nor	Malaysia	DNS	0		DNF

=== 400 metres ===
Rank	Heat	Name	Nationality	Time	Points	Notes	Overall
1	3	Jacob Minah	Germany	47.79	919		4310
2	2	Oleksiy Kasyanov	Ukraine	48.22	899		4190
3	1	Hans Van Alphen	Belgium	48.25	897		4121
4	2	Carlos Eduardo Chinin	Brazil	48.53	884		4271
5	3	Aleksandr Zyabrev	Russia	48.72	875		4002
6	2	Mikhail Logvinenko	Russia	48.82	870		3869
7	2	Aliaksandr Korzun	Belarus	48.87	867		3962
8	1	Jamie Adjetey-Nelson	Canada	49.32	846		4001
9	3	Ali Hazer	Lebanon	49.57	835		3523
10	1	Mikalai Shubianok	Belarus	49.68	829		3895
11	2	Álvaro Contreras	Spain	49.87	821		3830
12	3	David Gervasi	Switzerland	50.69	783		4001
13	1	Zhang Yu	China	51.50	747		3678
14	1	Alexis Chivás	Cuba	51.69	738		4004
15	1	Meelis Kosk	Estonia	52.57	700		3529
	1	Boonkete Chalon	Thailand	DNF	0		2739
	2	Igor Šarčević	Serbia	DNF	0		2924
	2	Mattias Cerlati	France	DNS	0		DNF
	3	Iván Scolfaro da Silva	Brazil	DNS	0		DNF

=== 110 metres hurdles ===
Wind:
Heat 1: -0.1 m/s, Heat 2: -0.2 m/s, Heat 3: -0.3 m/s

Rank	Heat	Name	Nationality	Time	Points	Notes	Overall
1	2	Jacob Minah	Germany	14.38	926		5236
2	2	Carlos Eduardo Chinin	Brazil	14.54	906		5177
3	2	Oleksiy Kasyanov	Ukraine	14.55	905		5095
4	1	Mikhail Logvinenko	Russia	14.68	889		4758
5	1	Alexis Chivás	Cuba	14.69	887		4891
6	2	David Gervasi	Switzerland	14.72	884		4885
7	3	Mikalai Shubianok	Belarus	14.75	880		4775
8	1	Hans Van Alphen	Belgium	14.85	868		4989
9	1	Jamie Adjetey-Nelson	Canada	15.16	830		4831
10	3	Ali Hazer	Lebanon	15.36	807		4330
11	1	Meelis Kosk	Estonia	15.45	796		4325
12	2	Aliaksandr Korzun	Belarus	15.49	791		4753
13	1	Álvaro Contreras	Spain	15.64	774		4604
14	2	Aleksandr Zyabrev	Russia	19.00	432		4434
	1	Zhang Yu	China	DNS	0		DNF
	2	Boonkete Chalon	Thailand	DNS	0		DNF
	3	Igor Šarčević	Serbia	DNS	0		DNF

=== Discus throw ===
Rank	Athlete	Nationality	#1	#2	#3	Result	Points	Notes	Overall
1	Alexis Chivás	Cuba	47.13	x	45.96	47.13	811		5702
2	Hans Van Alphen	Belgium	42.97	44.88	45.32	45.32	773		5762
3	Jamie Adjetey-Nelson	Canada	44.81	x	40.79	44.81	763		5594
4	Oleksiy Kasyanov	Ukraine	43.45	42.88	x	43.45	735		5830
5	Jacob Minah	Germany	36.12	42.38	42.12	42.38	713		5949
6	Mikalai Shubianok	Belarus	40.85	x	x	40.85	682		5457
7	Mikhail Logvinenko	Russia	40.83	x	x	40.83	681		5439
8	Aleksandr Zyabrev	Russia	x	34.90	38.79	38.79	640		5074
9	Meelis Kosk	Estonia	38.23	x	37.80	38.23	629		4954
10	Carlos Eduardo Chinin	Brazil	x	37.42	34.27	37.42	612		5789
11	Aliaksandr Korzun	Belarus	34.09	36.30	36.17	36.30	590		5343
12	Álvaro Contreras	Spain	29.78	34.75	x	34.75	559		5163
13	David Gervasi	Switzerland	x	x	34.75	34.75	559		5444
14	Ali Hazer	Lebanon	29.18	31.22	31.68	31.68	498		4828

=== Pole vault ===
Rank	Group	Athlete	Nationality	Result	Points	Notes	Overall
1	A	Mikhail Logvinenko	Russia	5.00	910		6349
2	A	Jacob Minah	Germany	4.80	849		6798
3	A	Mikalai Shubianok	Belarus	4.70	819		6276
4	A	David Gervasi	Switzerland	4.60	790		6234
5	B	Hans Van Alphen	Belgium	4.40	731		6493
6	B	Meelis Kosk	Estonia	4.40	731		5685
7	B	Carlos Eduardo Chinin	Brazil	4.40	731		6520
8	B	Aleksandr Zyabrev	Russia	4.30	702		5776
9	B	Jamie Adjetey-Nelson	Canada	4.30	702		6296
10	B	Alexis Chivás	Cuba	4.20	673		6375
11	B	Oleksiy Kasyanov	Ukraine	4.20	673		6503
	A	Aliaksandr Korzun	Belarus	NM	0		5343
	B	Álvaro Contreras	Spain	NM	0		5163
	B	Ali Hazer	Lebanon	NM	0		4828

=== Javelin throw ===
Rank	Athlete	Nationality	#1	#2	#3	Result	Points	Notes	Overall
1	Hans Van Alphen	Belgium	59.09	59.22	60.79	60.79	750		7243
2	Alexis Chivás	Cuba	57.36	58.95	59.29	59.29	727		7102
3	Jamie Adjetey-Nelson	Canada	55.48	51.02	53.26	55.48	670		6966
4	Aliaksandr Korzun	Belarus	55.37	54.73	52.96	55.37	668		6011
5	Carlos Eduardo Chinin	Brazil	47.21	45.81	55.14	55.14	665		7185
6	David Gervasi	Switzerland	54.07	55.09	54.92	55.09	664		6898
7	Mikalai Shubianok	Belarus	48.33	52.26	55.04	55.04	664		6940
8	Álvaro Contreras	Spain	49.09	54.84	53.54	54.84	661		5824
9	Aleksandr Zyabrev	Russia	53.11	x	53.30	53.30	638		6414
10	Jacob Minah	Germany	49.05	50.10	52.66	52.66	628		7426
11	Meelis Kosk	Estonia	48.78	x	52.08	52.08	619		6304
12	Oleksiy Kasyanov	Ukraine	x	47.84	49.64	49.64	583		7086
13	Mikhail Logvinenko	Russia	44.28	40.63	43.85	44.28	504		6853
14	Ali Hazer	Lebanon	41.72	x	x	41.72	467		5295

=== 1500 metres ===
Rank	Name	Nationality	Time	Points	Notes
1	Hans Van Alphen	Belgium	4:21.05	804	
2	Mikalai Shubianok	Belarus	4:24.56	781	
3	Oleksiy Kasyanov	Ukraine	4:25.91	772	
4	Mikhail Logvinenko	Russia	4:26.67	767	
5	Aleksandr Zyabrev	Russia	4:26.77	766	
6	Meelis Kosk	Estonia	4:29.40	749	
7	Carlos Eduardo Chinin	Brazil	4:31.52	735	
8	David Gervasi	Switzerland	4:39.15	686	
9	Jacob Minah	Germany	4:41.11	673	
10	Aliaksandr Korzun	Belarus	4:43.19	660	
11	Alexis Chivás	Cuba	4:55.95	583	
12	Jamie Adjetey-Nelson	Canada	5:01.51	551	
	Ali Hazer	Lebanon	DNF	0	
	Álvaro Contreras	Spain	DNS	0	

=== Final standings ===
The highest mark recorded in each event is highlighted in yellow

Rank	Athlete	Nationality	100m	LJ	SP	HJ	400m	110m H	DT	PV	JT	1500m	Points	Notes
1st place, gold medalist(s)	Jacob Minah	Germany	10.75	7.87	13.80	1.92	47.79	14.38	42.38	4.80	52.66	4:41.11	8099	PB
2nd place, silver medalist(s)	Hans Van Alphen	Belgium	11.16	7.49	15.39	1.83	48.25	14.85	45.32	4.40	60.79	4:21.05	8047	PB
3rd place, bronze medalist(s)	Carlos Eduardo Chinin	Brazil	11.00	7.46	13.15	2.13	48.53	14.54	37.42	4.40	55.14	4:31.52	7920	
4	Oleksiy Kasyanov	Ukraine	10.77	7.46	13.92	1.92	48.22	14.55	43.45	4.20	49.64	4:25.91	7858	
5	Mikalai Shubianok	Belarus	11.52	6.84	14.90	1.95	49.68	14.75	40.85	4.70	55.04	4:24.56	7721	
6	Alexis Chivás	Cuba	11.04	7.50	15.16	1.86	51.69	14.69	47.13	4.20	59.29	4:55.95	7685	
7	Mikhail Logvinenko	Russia	11.39	6.99	12.79	1.95	48.82	14.68	40.83	5.00	44.28	4:26.67	7620	
8	David Gervasi	Switzerland	11.38	7.18	15.13	1.98	50.69	14.72	34.75	4.60	55.09	4:39.15	7584	
9	Jamie Adjetey-Nelson	Canada	11.06	7.17	14.76	1.86	49.32	15.16	44.81	4.30	55.48	5:01.51	7517	
10	Aleksandr Zyabrev	Russia	11.04	7.15	14.29	1.86	48.72	19.00	38.79	4.30	53.30	4:26.77	7180	
11	Meelis Kosk	Estonia	11.78	6.66	13.45	1.89	52.57	15.45	38.23	4.40	52.08	4:29.40	7053	
12	Aliaksandr Korzun	Belarus	11.02	7.01	12.97	1.95	48.87	15.49	36.30	NM	55.37	4:43.19	6671	
13	Ali Hazer	Lebanon	11.30	6.67	10.74	1.80	49.57	15.36	31.68	NM	41.72	DNF	5295	
	Álvaro Contreras	Spain	11.71	7.20	12.76	1.98	49.87	15.64	34.75	NM	54.84	DNS	DNF	
	Zhang Yu	China	11.43	6.93	11.13	2.01	51.50	DNS	–	–	–	–	DNF	
	Igor Šarčević	Serbia	11.52	6.80	13.61	1.89	DNF	DNS	–	–	–	–	DNF	
	Boonkete Chalon	Thailand	11.41	6.62	12.16	1.80	DNF	DNS	–	–	–	–	DNF	
	Iván Scolfaro da Silva	Brazil	11.35	6.98	13.61	1.86	DNS	–	–	–	–	–	DNF	
	Mattias Cerlati	France	11.18	NM	14.26	1.98	DNS	–	–	–	–	–	DNF	
	Mohd Ikhwan Nor	Malaysia	11.61	6.85	11.46	DNS	–	–	–	–	–	–	DNF	
	Päärn Brauer	Estonia	11.77	3.20	DNS	–	–	–	–	–	–	–	DNF	
	Zhu Hengjun	China	11.63	NM	DNS	–	–	–	–	–	–	–	DNF	

== See also ==
- Athletics at the 2007 Pan American Games – Men's decathlon
- 2007 World Championships in Athletics – Men's decathlon
- 2007 Hypo-Meeting
