= David Gervasi =

Swiss decathlete

David Alvarez Gervasi (born 1 August 1983 in Poschiavo, Graubünden) is a decathlete from Switzerland. He set his personal best score (7755 points) in the men's decathlon on 1 June 2008 at the 2008 Hypo-Meeting in Götzis. Gervasi is a two-time national champion in the men's decathlon: 2005 and 2006.

== Achievements ==
Year	Competition	Venue	Position	Event	Notes
Representing Switzerland
2002	World Junior Championships	Kingston, Jamaica	15th	Decathlon (junior)	6829 pts
2005	Hypo-Meeting	Götzis, Austria	18th	Decathlon	7519 pts
2005	European U23 Championships	Erfurt, Germany	19th	Decathlon	6677 pts
2006	Hypo-Meeting	Götzis, Austria	—	Decathlon	DNF
2007	Hypo-Meeting	Götzis, Austria	15th	Decathlon	7518 pts
2007	Universiade	Bangkok, Thailand	8th	Decathlon	7584 pts
2008	Hypo-Meeting	Götzis, Austria	14th	Decathlon	7755 pts
