= 2007 Hypo-Meeting =

Track and field competition in Austria

The 33rd edition of the annual Hypo-Meeting took place on 26 May and 27 May 2007 in Götzis, Austria. The track and field competition, featuring a decathlon (men) and a heptathlon (women) event, was part of the 2007 IAAF World Combined Events Challenge.

== Men's decathlon ==
=== Schedule ===
26 May
1. 100 m
2. Long jump
3. Shot put
4. High jump
5. 400 m

27 May
6. 110 m hurdles
7. Discus throw
8. Pole vault
9. Javelin throw
10. 1,500 m

=== Records ===
World record	Roman Šebrle (CZE)	9026	27 May 2001	Götzis, Austria
Event record	Roman Šebrle (CZE)	9026	27 May 2001	Götzis, Austria

=== Results ===
Rank	Athlete	Decathlon										Points
Rank	Athlete	1	2	3	4	5	6	7	8	9	10	Points
1	Andrei Krauchanka (BLR)	10,86	7.90	13.89	2.15	47,46	14,05	39.63	5.00	64.35	4.29,10	8617
2	Roman Šebrle (CZE)	11,10	7.84	15.58	2.09	49,27	14,52	45.15	4.80	70.09	4.39,92	8518
3	Bryan Clay (USA)	10,40	7.80	15.30	2.09	48,41	13,97	36.14	4.80	69.09	4.51,32	8493
4	Aleksey Drozdov (RUS)	11,10	7.20	15.97	2.12	50,63	15,02	47.04	5.00	68.97	4.39,62	8373
5	André Niklaus (GER)	11,07	7.49	13.83	2.06	49,38	14,34	45.73	5.00	62.87	4.30,92	8340
6	Janis Karlivans (LAT)	11,13	7.82	15.01	2.06	49,10	14,86	47.95	4.70	60.55	4.43,62	8271
7	Norman Müller (GER)	10,91	7.49	14.58	1.91	48,26	14,53	44.43	5.00	62.06	4.34,23	8255
8	Maurice Smith (JAM)	10,71	6.84	17.25	2.03	47,79	13,83	51.68	4.50	46.71	4.43,64	8241
9	Pascal Behrenbruch (GER)	10,93	7.32	15.59	1.94	49,15	14,25	47.91	4.30	67.48	4.39,95	8199
10	Romain Barras (FRA)	11,26	6.83	14.67	1.94	49,48	14,27	43.53	5.00	62.61	4.26,88	8064
11	Lars Albert (GER)	11,19	7.19	15.23	1.94	51,69	15,09	48.58	4.70	62.48	4.41,84	7912
12	Nicklas Wiberg (SWE)	11,21	7.11	13.31	2.06	49,15	15,00	37.67	4.00	74.41	4.25,21	7870
13	Jacob Minah (GER)	10,80	7.13	13.42	1.94	47,75	14,60	38.93	4.90	47.71	4.41,94	7759
14	Dmitriy Karpov (KAZ)	10,92	7.22	16.26	2.09	48,36	14,36	48.14	4.90	59.08	DNF	7755
15	David Gervasi (SUI)	11,28	7.05	13.78	1.94	50,87	14,83	38.27	4.80	53.01	4.41,11	7518
—	Josef Karas (CZE)	11.04	7.33	14.34	1.91	50.10	15.49	45.76	4.50	48.45	—	DNF
—	Aleksey Sysoyev (RUS)	10.92	6.75	15.29	2.15	49.66	14.74	49.09	NM	55.10	—	DNF
—	Claston Bernard (JAM)	11.05	NM	14.23	2.06	50.27	14.49	43.67	NM	—	—	DNF
—	David Fröhlich (SUI)	11.08	6.53	13.02	1.79	49.90	14.95	—	—	—	—	DNF
—	Arthur Abele (GER)	11.10	7.29	13.71	2.00	49.92	—	—	—	—	—	DNF
—	Rudy Bourguignon (FRA)	11.17	7.11	13.71	1.88	50.63	—	—	—	—	—	DNF
—	Tomáš Dvořák (CZE)	11.03	7.46	16.14	2.00	50.00	—	—	—	—	—	DNF
—	Dennis Leyckes (GER)	10.96	6.80	14.04	1.94	48.07	—	—	—	—	—	DNF
—	Hamdi Dhouibi (TUN)	10.92	7.15	12.83	1.79	—	—	—	—	—	—	DNF
—	Markus Walser (AUT)	10.97	6.83	13.25	—	—	—	—	—	—	—	DNF

== Women's heptathlon ==
=== Schedule ===
26 May
1. 100 m hurdles
2. High jump
3. Shot put
4. 200 m

27 May
5. Long jump
6. Javelin throw
7. 800 m

=== Records ===
World record	Jackie Joyner-Kersee (USA)	7291	24 September 1988	Seoul, South Korea
Event record	Sabine Braun (GER)	6985	31 May 1992	Götzis, Austria

=== Results ===
Rank	Athlete	Heptathlon							Points
Rank	Athlete	1	2	3	4	5	6	7	Points
1	Carolina Klüft (SWE)	13.27	1.85	14.34	23.86	6.62	44.16	2:10.86	6681
2	Lyudmila Blonska (UKR)	13.53	1.85	13.65	24.69	6.57	51.53	2:12.18	6626
3	Jennifer Oeser (GER)	13.51	1.82	14.05	24.75	6.17	47.60	2:15.13	6366
4	Jessica Zelinka (CAN)	13.34	1.79	13.98	24.39	6.15	42.71	2:10.93	6343
5	Austra Skujytė (LTU)	14.23	1.85	16.37	25.51	6.10	47.39	2:21.27	6277
6	Karin Ruckstuhl (NED)	13.59	1.79	14.04	24.62	6.54	36.60	2:13.37	6260
7	Kelly Sotherton (GBR)	13.40	1.82	13.99	24.24	6.44	30.19	2:12.89	6210
8	Lilli Schwarzkopf (GER)	13.82	1.76	13.68	25.73	6.17	48.64	2:11.69	6202
9	Karolina Tyminska (POL)	13.90	1.67	14.53	24.30	6.31	38.31	2:08.19	6164
10	Nataliya Dobrynska (UKR)	14.21	1.79	15.40	25.46	6.14	42.79	2:18.06	6112
11	Claudia Tonn (GER)	13.85	1.73	12.66	24.96	6.38	39.48	2:07.87	6108
12	Julia Mächtig (GER)	14.54	1.67	13.85	24.54	6.48	43.40	2:13.87	6077
13	Olga Levenkova (RUS)	14.16	1.76	13.61	25.45	6.11	43.90	2:11.79	6062
14	Laurien Hoos (NED)	13.66	1.70	15.28	24.85	5.98	48.37	2:27.40	6061
15	Denisa Šcerbová (CZE)	13.60	1.73	11.88	24.31	6.46	35.12	2:13.23	6017
16	Simone Oberer (SUI)	13.63	1.82	11.19	25.43	6.16	41.51	2:13.69	5996
17	Linda Züblin (SUI)	13.69	1.67	12.87	24.98	5.89	48.19	2:18.23	5938
18	Hanna Melnychenko (UKR)	13.76	1.82	13.13	24.84	6.24	36.22	2:24.93	5931
19	Argiro Strataki (GRE)	14.14	1.73	13.73	25.58	6.05	41.65	2:15.66	5907
20	Sylvie Dufour (SUI)	14.10	1.73	13.38	26.04	5.72	47.92	2:14.54	5886
21	Antoinette Nana Djimou Ida (FRA)	15.13	1.79	13.17	24.88	5.59	45.87	2:20.63	5749
22	Ida Marcussen (NOR)	14.69	1.67	12.11	25.61	6.02	47.26	2:15.93	5744
23	Yvonne Wisse (NED)	13.81	1.70	12.13	25.10	5.62	39.00	2:14.50	5691
24	Julie Hollman (GBR)	14.18	1.76	12.05	25.20	5.94	37.41	2:20.43	5681
25	Irina Naumenko (KAZ)	14.08	1.76	13.27	25.39	5.84	35.97	2:22.97	5666
26	Jesenija Volžankina (LAT)	13.67	1.76	11.54	24.82	6.07	30.16	2:24.03	5609
27	Marisa De Aniceto (FRA)	13.99	1.67	10.97	25.57	5.45	45.14	2:14.88	5572

== See also ==
- 2007 World Championships in Athletics – Men's decathlon
- Athletics at the 2007 Summer Universiade – Men's decathlon
- 2007 World Championships in Athletics – Women's heptathlon
