= Gonzalo Barroilhet =

Chilean decathlete

Personal information
- Full name: Gonzalo Barroilhet Costabal
- Born: August 19, 1986 (age 39) Santiago, Chile
- Height: 1.93 m (6 ft 4 in)
- Weight: 92 kg (203 lb)

Sport
- Country: Chile
- Sport: Athletics
- Event: Combined events
- Updated on 2 May 2014

Gonzalo Barroilhet Costabal (born August 19, 1986 in Santiago, Chile) is a male decathlete from Chile. He competed for his native country at the 2008 and 2012 Summer Olympics. He is affiliated with the Florida State Seminoles in Tallahassee, Florida.

== Personal bests ==
- 100 m: 10.99 (wind: +0.8 m/s) – Charlottesville, Virginia, 19 April 2012
- 400 m: 49.82 – Des Moines, Iowa, 6 June 2012
- 1500 m: 4:37.04 – Des Moines, Iowa, 7 June 2012
- 110 m hurdles: 13.78 (wind: +0.6 m/s) – Tallahassee, Florida, 30 May 2008
- High jump: 2.06 m – Charlottesville, Virginia, 19 April 2012
- Pole vault: 5.45 m – Atlanta, Georgia, 11 May 2012
- Long jump: 7.15 m (wind: -0.3 m/s) – São Paulo, 7 June 2007
- Shot put: 14.52 m – Atlanta, Georgia, 13 April 2013
- Discus throw: 47.63 m – Santiago, 15 March 2014
- Javelin throw: 57.83 m – São Paulo, 6 August 2011
- Decathlon: 8065 pts NR – Charlottesville, Virginia, 20 April 2012

== Competition record ==
Year	Competition	Venue	Position	Event	Notes
Representing Chile
2005	Pan American Junior Championships	Windsor, Ontario, Canada	—	Decathlon	DNF
2005	South American Junior Championships	Rosario, Argentina	1st	Decathlon (junior)	7304 pts
2006	Ibero-American Championships	Ponce, Puerto Rico	10th (h)	110 m hurdles	15.81
2006	South American U23 Championships / South American Games	Buenos Aires, Argentina	—	Decathlon	DNF
2007	Pan American Games	Rio de Janeiro, Brazil	8th	Decathlon	7193 pts
2007	South American Championships	São Paulo, Brazil	1st	Decathlon	7504 pts (NR)
2008	Olympic Games	Beijing, China	–	Decathlon	DNF
2011	Pan American Games	Rio de Janeiro, Brazil	4th	Decathlon	7986 pts (NR)
2012	Olympic Games	London, United Kingdom	13th	Decathlon	7972 pts
2014	South American Games	Santiago, Chile	3rd	Pole vault	5.20 m
2014	South American Games	Santiago, Chile	2nd	Decathlon	7617 pts
2014	Ibero-American Championships	São Paulo, Brazil	4th	Decathlon	7111 pts
2015	Pan American Combined Events Cup	Ottawa, Canada	—	Decathlon	DNF
