= Adolphus Jones =

Kittitian and Nevisian athlete and soccer player

Personal information
- Full name: Adolphus Bentos Jones
- Nickname: Dolly
- Born: 24 July 1984 (age 42) Basseterre, Saint Kitts and Nevis
- Years active: 2002–present
- Height: 6 ft 1 in (185 cm)

Sport
- Country: Saint Kitts and Nevis
- Sport: Athletics, soccer
- Events: Decathlon, goalkeeper
- College team: UT Arlington Mavericks
- Club: FLOW 4G Cayon Rockets
- Updated on 28 December 2014

Adolphus "Dolly" Jones (born 24 July 1984)^{[nb]} is a Kittitian and Nevisian track and field athlete and soccer player.

In the decathlon he competed for his native country at the 2007 Pan American Games, the 2010 Commonwealth Games, and the Central American and Caribbean Championships in Athletics in 2008 and 2009. He holds several Saint Kitts and Nevis records in athletics, including 7258 points in the decathlon and 5475 points for the indoor heptathlon.

He played as goalkeeper for the Saint Kitts and Nevis national football team in two matches for the 2006 FIFA World Cup qualifiers.

== Career ==
=== Early life ===
Born in Basseterre, he began taking part in both athletics and soccer as a teenager. At the 2003 Leeward Islands Junior Championships in Athletics he competed in a variety of events, winning medals in the 800 metres, high jump, long jump, triple jump and javelin throw. He entered the 800 m and 1500 metres at the 2003 CARIFTA Games, placing sixth and seventeenth, respectively.

He was selected for the Saint Kitts and Nevis national football team in 2004 and was the goalkeeper for two of their games in the 2006 FIFA World Cup qualifiers. In November that year, he conceded thirteen goals over two matches against Mexico. He had better outings in the 2005 Caribbean Cup qualifiers, keeping a clean sheet in a 2–0 win against Antigua and Barbuda and winning 6–1 against Montserrat, although the team lost to Haiti by a goal to nil.

=== Senior competition ===
In 2006, he began studying at Paul Quinn College in Texas, United States. He competed athletically for the school in track events, as well as soccer. In his first year there he finished fourth in the high jump at the NAIA national men's outdoor track and field championship, setting a school record and Saint Kitts and Nevis national record of 2.08 m (6 ft 9 3/4 in). He competed at July's 2006 NACAC Under-23 Championships in Athletics, where he jumped a height of 2.05 m (6 ft 8 1/2 in) for tenth place. Later that month he made his senior debut international performance in track and field, running in the 800 m heats and placing twelfth in the high jump at the 2006 Central American and Caribbean Games. Two further outings came in 2007, both in July. First, he made his decathlon debut at the 2007 NACAC Championships, coming second with 6092 points to Darwin Colón in a two-man contest. The following week both men entered the decathlon at the 2007 Pan American Games, although Jones failed to complete all ten events. He also ran with the 4×400 m relay team in the heat stages.

Jones gave two national record performances in 2008, having a high jump best of 2.11 m (6 ft 11 in) and a decathlon best of 6852 points. His high jump mark came in the decathlon competition at the 2008 Central American and Caribbean Championships in Athletics, which he failed to finish. He enrolled at The University of Texas at Arlington, majoring in interdisciplinary studies. Competing on the Texas-Arlington Mavericks team, he scored 5146 points in the indoor heptathlon at the Southland Conference Indoor Championships Outdoors he scored a best of 6980 points at the Texas Relays before setting a national record mark of 7178 points for fourth at the Southland Conference Outdoor Championships. His third and last decathlon outing that year was at the 2009 Central American and Caribbean Championships in Athletics, where he came seventh with 6774 points in total. In the individual events he set seven personal bests outdoors, including national records in the 110 metres hurdles (15.19 seconds) and the pole vault (4.25 m (13 ft 11 1/4 in)).

=== 2010 Commonwealth Games ===
Working with track coach Eric Francis, who grew up in Saint Kitts, he opened his 2010 indoor season with a 5532-point heptathlon at the Iowa State Track and Field Classic (on an oversized track not suitable for record purposes). Following this he set a series of national indoor records at the Southland Conference meet: he ran 8.46 seconds for the 60 m hurdles, recorded 2.06 m (6 ft 9 in) in the high jump, 4.45 m (14 ft 7 in) in the pole vault, and a total of 5475 points in the heptathlon. His sole major outdoor performance that year saw him improve his decathlon national record to 7258 points, which was enough for seventh place at the 2010 Commonwealth Games and included a 110 m hurdles national record of 14.89 seconds. He was the highest rankings Caribbean athlete in the event. Despite this result, he ceased competing internationally that year.

He returned to Saint Kitts and became involved with Garden Hotspurs FC, a Basseterre soccer club, and played for the team as well as being appointed as club Vice President in 2013.

== Personal bests ==
Outdoor

- 100 metres – 11.06 sec (2008)
- 400 metres – 48.92 sec (2008)
- 800 metres – 1:56.81 min (2003)
- 1500 metres – 4:22.77 min (2008)
- 110 metres hurdles – 14.89 sec (2010) NR
- High jump – 2.12 m (6 ft 11 1/4 in) (2014) NR
- Pole vault – 4.25 m (13 ft 11 1/4 in) (2009) NR
- Long jump – 7.08 m (23 ft 2 1/2 in) (2010)
- Shot put – 13.47 m (44 ft 2 1/4 in) (2010)
- Discus throw – 38.23 m (125 ft 5 in) (2010)
- Javelin throw – 49.99 m (164 ft 0 in) (2009)
- Decathlon – 7258 points (2010) NR

Indoor

- 60 metres – 7.19 sec (2010)
- 400 metres – 49.43 sec (2007)
- 1000 metres – 2:51.13 min (2010)
- 60 metres hurdles – 8.46 sec (2010) NR
- High jump – 2.06 m (6 ft 9 in) (2010) NR
- Pole vault – 4.45 m (14 ft 7 in) (2010) NR
- Long jump – 7.05 m (23 ft 1 1/2 in) (2010)
- Shot put – 13.10 m (42 ft 11 1/2 in) (2010) NR
- Heptathlon – 5475 points (2010) NR
- Heptathlon over-sized track: 5532 points (2010)

== International competition record ==
Year	Competition	Venue	Position	Event	Notes
Representing Saint Kitts and Nevis
2002	Leeward Islands Junior Championships (U20)	Road Town, British Virgin Islands	5th	800m	2:15.12
2003	CARIFTA Games (U-20)	Port of Spain, Trinidad and Tobago	6th	800 metres	1:56.81
2003	CARIFTA Games (U-20)	Port of Spain, Trinidad and Tobago	17th	1500 metres	4:30.61
2003	Leeward Islands Junior Championships (U20)	Road Town, British Virgin Islands	4th	400 m	52.80
2003	Leeward Islands Junior Championships (U20)	Road Town, British Virgin Islands	3rd	800 m	2:12.83
2003	Leeward Islands Junior Championships (U20)	Road Town, British Virgin Islands	2nd	High jump	1.90 m
2003	Leeward Islands Junior Championships (U20)	Road Town, British Virgin Islands	3rd	Long jump	6.42 m (wind: NWI)
2003	Leeward Islands Junior Championships (U20)	Road Town, British Virgin Islands	2nd	Triple jump	12.99 m (wind: NWI)
2003	Leeward Islands Junior Championships (U20)	Road Town, British Virgin Islands	5th	Discus	26.90 m
2003	Leeward Islands Junior Championships (U20)	Road Town, British Virgin Islands	2nd	Javelin	39.84 m
2006	NACAC Under-23 Championships	Santo Domingo, Dominican Republic	10th	High jump	2.05 m
2006	Central American and Caribbean Games	Cartagena, Colombia	17th (heats)	800 m	1:59.59
2006	Central American and Caribbean Games	Cartagena, Colombia	12th	High jump	1.95 m
2007	NACAC Championships	San Salvador, El Salvador	2nd	Decathlon	6092 pts
2007	Pan American Games	Rio de Janeiro, Brazil	—	Decathlon	DNF
2007	Pan American Games	Rio de Janeiro, Brazil	9th (heats)	4×400 m relay	3:21.77
2008	Central American and Caribbean Championships	Cali, Colombia	—	Decathlon	DNF
2009	Central American and Caribbean Championships	Havana, Cuba	5th	Decathlon	6774 pts
2010	Commonwealth Games	New Delhi, India	7th	Decathlon	7258 pts
2014	Central American and Caribbean Games	Xalapa, Mexico	7th	Decathlon	6315 pts A

== Notes ==
- ^{nb} Some sources list his birthday as 29 January 1984.
