= 2005 European Athletics U23 Championships – Men's decathlon =

The men's decathlon event at the 2005 European Athletics U23 Championships was held in Erfurt, Germany, at Steigerwaldstadion on 14 and 15 July.

== Medalists ==
Gold	Aleksey Drozdov; Russia
Silver	Aleksey Sysoyev; Russia
Bronze	Norman Müller; Germany

== Results ==
=== Final ===
14–15 July

The highest mark recorded in each event is highlighted in yellow

Rank	Name	Nationality	100m	LJ	SP	HJ	400m	110m H	DT	PV	JT	1500m	Points	Notes
1st place, gold medalist(s)	Aleksey Drozdov	Russia	11.18 (w: 0.5 m/s)	7.29 (w: 0.1 m/s)	15.38	2.07	50.67	14.86 (w: 0.6 m/s)	49.10	4.70	63.97	4:38.33	8196	
2nd place, silver medalist(s)	Aleksey Sysoyev	Russia	10.93 (w: 0.9 m/s)	6.95 (w: 0.4 m/s)	15.45	2.16	50.62	14.84 (w: 0.6 m/s)	51.73	4.30	59.30	4:44.63	8089	
3rd place, bronze medalist(s)	Norman Müller	Germany	10.96 (w: 0.9 m/s)	7.48 (w: 0.8 m/s)	14.16	1.95	47.68	14.73 (w: 0.6 m/s)	40.99	4.80	53.06	4:34.01	7989	
4	Frédéric Xhonneux	Belgium	11.41 (w: 0.9 m/s)	7.21 (w: 1.8 m/s)	12.98	1.98	48.92	14.76 (w: 0.6 m/s)	39.49	4.30	58.05	4:14.45	7745	
5	Lassi Raunio	Finland	10.90 (w: 0.9 m/s)	6.95 (w: 0.5 m/s)	13.95	1.92	49.81	14.34 (w: 0.6 m/s)	42.19	4.30	59.94	4:52.01	7650	
6	Mikko Halvari	Finland	11.15 (w: 0.4 m/s)	6.93 (w: -0.4 m/s)	14.08	1.89	51.49	15.05 (w: -0.3 m/s)	47.89	4.70	54.65	4:51.23	7567	
7	Nadir El Fassi	France	11.17 (w: 0.9 m/s)	6.95 (w: 0.6 m/s)	13.16	2.01	50.63	14.86 (w: 0.6 m/s)	38.10	4.30	52.14	4:15.06	7562	
8	Mattias Cerlati	France	11.11 (w: 0.5 m/s)	7.48 (w: 0.3 m/s)	14.75	1.95	52.00	16.02 (w: -0.5 m/s)	42.61	4.60	55.87	4:50.95	7550	
9	Marian Geisler	Germany	11.40 (w: 0.5 m/s)	7.58 (w: 0.0 m/s)	11.55	2.01	50.02	15.39 (w: -0.5 m/s)	38.26	4.50	49.30	4:18.89	7524	
10	Christopher Hallmann	Germany	10.82 (w: 0.4 m/s)	6.52 (w: 0.8 m/s)	13.60	1.86	49.67	14.95 (w: 0.6 m/s)	35.00	4.80	55.09	4:35.28	7459	
11	Attila Szabó	Hungary	11.27 (w: 0.4 m/s)	7.06 (w: 1.6 m/s)	14.12	1.92	50.66	14.68 (w: -0.5 m/s)	40.10	4.40	52.81	4:57.92	7369	
12	Ismael González	Spain	11.12 (w: 0.4 m/s)	7.10 (w: 0.1 m/s)	13.78	1.89	50.16	15.01 (w: -0.3 m/s)	38.82	4.60	48.84	4:52.94	7350	
13	Ben Hazell	United Kingdom	11.46 (w: 0.4 m/s)	6.90 (w: 0.2 m/s)	12.43	1.89	49.82	15.34 (w: -0.3 m/s)	43.03	3.90	59.62	4:29.17	7319	
14	Pelle Rietveld	Netherlands	11.29 (w: 0.9 m/s)	6.85 (w: -0.5 m/s)	12.53	1.83	49.20	15.53 (w: -0.5 m/s)	34.73	4.50	60.20	4:30.26	7308	
15	Tanel Türk	Estonia	11.20 (w: 0.9 m/s)	7.03 (w: 0.0 m/s)	13.79	1.86	50.23	15.80 (w: -0.3 m/s)	40.79	4.00	52.21	4:30.47	7252	
16	David Fröhlich	Switzerland	10.94 (w: 0.4 m/s)	6.50 (w: 0.7 m/s)	12.90	1.89	49.02	15.01 (w: -0.3 m/s)	34.52	4.40	49.36	4:40.93	7183	
17	Ángel Barreda	Spain	10.91 (w: 0.5 m/s)	7.52 (w: 0.7 m/s)	11.25	1.80	49.04	15.19 (w: -0.3 m/s)	30.64	4.60	47.81	4:46.75	7156	
18	Bjørn Sigurd Sommerfeldt	Norway	11.41 (w: 0.5 m/s)	6.98 (w: 1.5 m/s)	13.75	1.86	51.75	15.39 (w: -0.5 m/s)	40.41	4.10	49.29	4:36.04	7112	
19	David Gervasi	Switzerland	11.37 (w: 0.5 m/s)	7.16 (w: 0.8 m/s)	13.28	2.01	DNF	14.53 (w: 0.6 m/s)	37.77	4.70	49.42	4:49.26	6677	
20	Michał Chalabala	Poland	11.36 (w: 0.9 m/s)	7.02 (w: 1.0 m/s)	12.71	1.95	49.13	15.15 (w: -0.5 m/s)	37.76	NM	55.55	4:50.79	6598	
21	Guillaume Barras	France	11.31 (w: 0.4 m/s)	6.85 (w: -0.2 m/s)	13.51	1.92	DNF	14.98 (w: -0.3 m/s)	36.14	NM	25.39	4:48.87	5299	
	Ludo van der Plaat	Netherlands	11.28 (w: 0.5 m/s)	7.00 (w: 1.6 m/s)	12.15	1.86	49.98	DNF					DNF	
	Łukasz Płaczek	Poland	11.07 (w: 0.5 m/s)	7.15 (w: 0.4 m/s)	11.92	2.01							DNF	

== Participation ==
According to an unofficial count, 23 athletes from 13 countries participated in the event.

- Belgium (1)
- Estonia (1)
- Finland (2)
- France (3)
- Germany (3)
- Hungary (1)
- Netherlands (2)
- Norway (1)
- Poland (2)
- Russia (2)
- Spain (2)
- Switzerland (2)
- United Kingdom (1)
