= Maurice Smith (decathlete) =

Jamaican decathlete (born 1980)

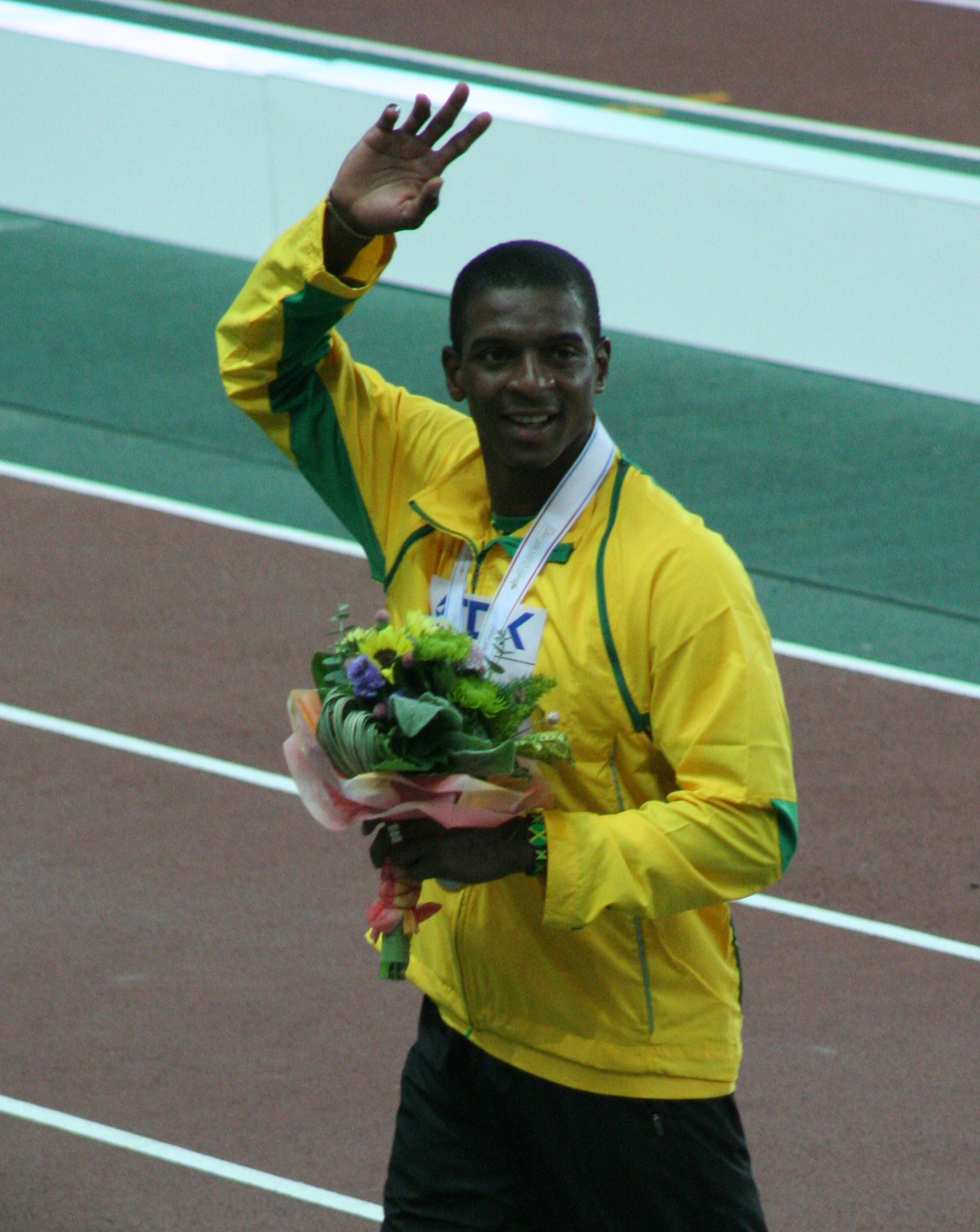
- Smith in 2007 Osaka

Personal information
- Full name: Maurice Leon Hugh Smith
- Born: 28 September 1980 (age 45) Spanish Town, Saint Catherine, Jamaica
- Height: 1.90 m (6 ft 3 in)
- Weight: 90 kg (198 lb)

Sport
- Country: Jamaica
- Sport: Athletics
Medal record
Representing Jamaica
Men's athletics
World Championships
Silver medal – second place	2007 Osaka	Decathlon
Pan American Games
Gold medal – first place	2007 Rio de Janeiro	Decathlon
Silver medal – second place	2011 Guadalajara	Decathlon
CAC Games
Gold medal – first place	2010 Mayagüez	Decathlon
Commonwealth Games
Silver medal – second place	2006 Melbourne	Decathlon
CAC Athletics Championships
Gold medal – first place	2001 Guatemala City	Decathlon
CARIFTA Games Junior (U20)
Gold medal – first place	1999 Fort-de-France	Heptathlon
- Updated on 3 July 2013

Maurice Smith (born 28 September 1980) is a Jamaican decathlete. He competed for Auburn University. He represented his native country at the 2004 Summer Olympics in Athens, Greece, finishing in 14th place. He broke the Pan American Games decathlon record in 2007, winning his first international gold medal. He won the silver medal in the decathlon at the 2007 World Championships. Smith is the current national record holder in the men's decathlon, with 8644 points.

Smith beat World Champion Roman Šebrle and Dmitriy Karpov at the TNT-Fortuna Combined Events meeting in Kladno, Czech Republic with 8157 points, setting him up well for the 2009 World Championships in Athletics.

== Achievements ==
Year	Competition	Venue	Position	Event	Notes
Representing Jamaica
1998	Central American and Caribbean Junior Championships (U-20)	George Town, Cayman Islands	4th	Javelin throw	53.46 m
1999	CARIFTA Games (U-20)	Fort-de-France, Martinique	8th	Shot put	12.45 m
1999	CARIFTA Games (U-20)	Fort-de-France, Martinique	5th	Discus throw	42.57 m
1999	CARIFTA Games (U-20)	Fort-de-France, Martinique	6th	Javelin throw	53.54 m
1999	CARIFTA Games (U-20)	Fort-de-France, Martinique	1st	Heptathlon	5623 pts
1999	Pan American Junior Championships	Tampa, United States	3rd	Decathlon	6996 pts
2000	NACAC U-25 Championships	Monterrey, Mexico	1st	Decathlon	7090 pts
2001	Central American and Caribbean Championships	Guatemala City, Guatemala	1st	Decathlon	7755 pts
2004	Olympic Games	Athens, Greece	14th	Decathlon	8023 pts
2005	NACAC Combined Events Championships	San Juan, Puerto Rico	1st	Decathlon	8232 pts
2005	World Championships	Helsinki, Finland	–	Decathlon	DNF
2005	Décastar	Talence, France	14th	Decathlon	7336 pts
2006	Commonwealth Games	Melbourne, Australia	2nd	Decathlon	8074 pts
2006	Hypo-Meeting	Götzis, Austria	3rd	Decathlon	8269 pts
2007	Hypo-Meeting	Götzis, Austria	8th	Decathlon	8241 pts
2007	Pan American Games	Rio de Janeiro, Brazil	1st	Decathlon	8278 pts
2007	World Championships	Osaka, Japan	2nd	Decathlon	8644 pts
2008	Hypo-Meeting	Götzis, Austria	5th	Decathlon	8332 pts
2008	Olympic Games	Beijing, China	9th	Decathlon	8205 pts
2009	Hypo-Meeting	Götzis, Austria	–	Decathlon	DNF
2009	World Championships	Berlin, Germany	–	Decathlon	DNF
2010	CAC Games	Mayagüez, Puerto Rico	1st	Decathlon	8109 pts
2011	NACAC Combined Events Championships	Kingston, Jamaica	1st	Decathlon	8078 pts
2011	World Championships	Daegu, South Korea	–	Decathlon	DNF
2011	Pan American Games	Guadalajara, Mexico	2nd	Decathlon	8214 pts

== Personal bests ==
=== Outdoor ===
Event	Performance	Location	Date	Points
Decathlon	8,644 points	Osaka	September 1, 2007	8,644 points
100 metres	10.62 (+0.7 m/s)	Osaka	August 31, 2007	947 points
Long jump	7.51 m (24 ft 7 1/2 in) (+1.8 m/s)	Ratingen	June 24, 2006	937 points
Shot put	17.78 m (58 ft 4 in)	Kladno	June 18, 2008	961 points
High jump	2.03 m (6 ft 7 3/4 in)	Götzis	May 26, 2007	831 points
400 metres	47.48	Osaka	August 31, 2007	934 points
110 metres hurdles	13.76 (+1.3 m/s)	Götzis	May 26, 2007	1,006 points
Discus throw	57.08 m (187 ft 3 in)	Kingston	April 13, 2000	1,019 points
Pole vault	4.80 m (15 ft 8 3/4 in)	Osaka	September 1, 2007	849 points
Javelin throw	61.52 m (201 ft 10 in)	Athens	August 24, 2004	761 points
1500 metres	4:29.95	Götzis	May 27, 2007	745 points
Virtual Best Performance				8,990 points

=== Indoor ===
Event	Performance	Location	Date	Points
Heptathlon	6,035 points	Fayetteville	February 26, 2005	6,035 points
60 metres	6.94	Fayetteville	February 25, 2005	904 points
Long jump	7.27 m (23 ft 10 in)	Crete	February 3, 2007	878 points
Shot put	17.70 m (58 ft 3/4 in)	Birmingham	January 21, 2012	956 points
High jump	2.00 m (6 ft 6 1/2 in)	Lexington	February 27, 2004	803 points
60 metres hurdles	7.88	Fayetteville	February 26, 2005	1,012 points
Pole vault	4.70 m (15 ft 5 in)	Fayetteville	March 12, 2005	819 points
1000 metres	2:39.32	Fayetteville	February 26, 2005	881 points
Virtual Best Performance				6,253 points
