= Jacob Minah =

German decathlete

Jacob Minah (born 3 April 1982) is a decathlete from Germany. He set his personal best in the event (8099 points) on 13 August 2007 at the 2007 Summer Universiade in Bangkok, Thailand, earning him the gold medal. He is a nephew of former vice-president of Sierra Leone, Francis Minah.

== Achievements ==
Year	Competition	Venue	Position	Event
2007	Hypo-Meeting	Götzis, Austria	13th	Decathlon
2007	World Student Games	Bangkok, Thailand	1st	Decathlon
2008	Hypo-Meeting	Götzis, Austria	16th	Decathlon
2009	Hypo-Meeting	Götzis, Austria	14th	Decathlon
