= Athletics at the 2007 Pan American Games – Men's decathlon =

Men's decathlon at the Pan American Games

The men's decathlon event at the 2007 Pan American Games took place on July 23 and July 24, 2007. There were a total number of 12 athletes competing, from 9 nations. Jamaica's Maurice Smith took the gold with 8278 points, a new Games record, while Cuban Yordanis García became second with 8113 and Brazilian Carlos Eduardo Chinin was third with 7977.

== Medalists ==
Gold	Maurice Smith; Jamaica
Silver	Yordanis García; Cuba
Bronze	Carlos Chinin; Brazil

== Schedule ==
July 23
1. 100 m
2. Long jump
3. Shot put
4. High jump
5. 400 m

July 24
6. 110 m hurdles
7. Discus throw
8. Pole vault
9. Javelin throw
10. 1,500 m

== Records ==
World record	Roman Šebrle (CZE)	9026	May 27, 2001	Götzis, Austria
Pan Am record	Chris Huffins (USA)	8170	July 25, 1999	Winnipeg, Canada

== Results ==
Rank	Athlete	Decathlon										Points
Rank	Athlete	1	2	3	4	5	6	7	8	9	10	Points
Gold medal	Maurice Smith (JAM)	10.84	7.27	16.93	1.97	47.99	14.06	53.24	4.40	50.23	4:40.12	8278
Silver medal	Yordanis García (CUB)	10.67	7.14	14.57	2.03	49.96	14.01	45.93	4.50	63.75	4:51.74	8113
Bronze medal	Carlos Chinin (BRA)	10.88	7.76	13.44	2.09	48.36	14.52	37.01	4.30	51.95	4:23.99	7977
4	Leonel Suárez (CUB)	11.20	7.32	12.78	1.88	49.09	14.47	41.07	4.50	71.39	4:29.32	7936
5	Ryan Harlan (USA)	11.15	6.78	15.96	2.03	49.85	14.33	42.79	4.80	55.99	5:26.59	7687
6	Chris Boyles (USA)	11.29	7.07	14.97	2.06	51.36	14.98	42.67	4.60	55.52	4:52.00	7666
7	Iván Scolfaro da Silva (BRA)	11.21	7.05	13.57	1.97	49.85	14.84	41.51	4.60	58.57	4:44.03	7665
8	Gonzalo Barroilhet (CHI)	11.45	6.79	13.38	1.91	52.53	14.65	41.78	4.80	52.80	5:14.47	7193
9	Octavius Gillespie (GUA)	11.82	6.77	12.31	1.97	53.76	15.98	39.35	4.00	60.39	4:57.19	6821
10	Gerardo Canale (ARG)	11.65	6.84	12.34	2.00	52.43	15.71	36.08	4.00	44.95	5:02.33	6661
11	Darwin Colón (HON)	11.19	6.34	11.82	1.73	52.72	15.08	40.19	3.00	43.63	5:08.58	6209
—	Adolphus Jones (SKN)	11.17	6.75	11.19	2.03	DSQ	DSQ	NM	—	—	—	DNF

== See also ==
- 2007 World Championships in Athletics – Men's decathlon
- Athletics at the 2007 Summer Universiade – Men's decathlon
- Athletics at the 2008 Summer Olympics – Men's decathlon
