= Tamara Wigley =

Kittitian athlete (born 1975)

Tamara Gail Wigley-Brudy (born 9 April 1975) is an athlete from Saint Kitts and Nevis.

She was a member of the first ever team to represent Saint Kitts and Nevis at the Olympic Games when she competed in the 4 x 400 metres relay at the 1996 Summer Olympics. The team finished seventh in their heat and so did not qualify for the final.
