= Román Gastaldi =

Argentine decathlete (born 1989)

Personal information
- Born: 25 September 1989 (age 36) Devoto, Córdoba, Argentina

Sport
- Sport: Track and field

Román Andrés Gastaldi (born 25 September 1989) is an Argentine decathlete. He competed at the 2011 Pan American Games in Guadalajara, Mexico and 2013 World Championships in Moscow, Russia.

== Competition record ==
Year	Competition	Venue	Position	Event	Notes
Representing Argentina
2010	South American Games / South American U23 Championships	Medellín, Colombia	–	Decathlon	DNF
2010	Ibero-American Championships	San Fernando, Spain	3rd	Decathlon	7290 pts
2011	South American Championships	Buenos Aires, Argentina	2nd	Decathlon	7545 pts
2011	Pan American Games	Guadalajara, Mexico	5th	Decathlon	7826 pts
2013	South American Championships	Cartagena, Colombia	1st	Decathlon	7273 pts
2013	World Championships	Moscow, Russia	–	Decathlon	DNF
2014	South American Games	Santiago, Chile	–	Decathlon	DNF
2014	Ibero-American Championships	São Paulo, Brazil	–	Decathlon	DNF
2016	Ibero-American Championships	Rio de Janeiro, Brazil	1st	Decathlon	7634 pts
2017	South American Championships	Asunción, Paraguay	–	Decathlon	DNF
