= 2007 World Championships in Athletics – Men's decathlon =

The men's decathlon at the 2007 World Championships in Athletics was held at the Nagai Stadium, Osaka, on Friday, 31 August, and Saturday, 1 September.

The winning margin was 32 points which as of 2024 is the only time the decathlon has been won by fewer than 80 points at these championships.

== Medalists ==
| Gold | Roman Šebrle; Czech Republic (CZE) |
| Silver | Maurice Smith; Jamaica (JAM) |
| Bronze | Dmitriy Karpov; Kazakhstan (KAZ) |

== Schedule ==
Friday, 31 August
1. 100 m
2. Long jump
3. Shot put
4. High jump
5. 400 m

Saturday, 1 September
6. 110 m hurdles
7. Discus throw
8. Pole vault
9. Javelin throw
10. 1,500 m

== Records ==
| World record | Roman Šebrle (CZE) | 9026 | 27 May 2001 | Götzis, Austria |
| Event record | Tomáš Dvořák (CZE) | 8902 | 7 August 2001 | Edmonton, Canada |

== Final ranking ==
Key

The highest mark recorded in each event is highlighted in yellow. These marks were split between seven competitors with the gold medallist claiming two of them.

Points table after 10th event

| Rank | Athlete | Overall points | 100 m | LJ | SP | HJ | 400 m | 110 mh | DT | PV | JT | 1500 m |
| 1 | Roman Šebrle (CZE) | 8676 | 852 pts 11.04 s | 950 pts 7.56 m | 846 pts 15.92 m | 915 pts 2.12 m | 871 pts 48.80 s | 932 pts 14.33 s | 844 pts 48.75 m | 849 pts 4.80 m | 907 pts 71.18 m | 710 pts 4:35.32 min |
| 2 | Maurice Smith (JAM) | 8644 (NR) | 947 pts 10.62 s | 935 pts 7.50 m | 933 pts 17.32 m | 776 pts 1.97 m | 934 pts 47.48 s | 986 pts 13.91 s | 920 pts 52.36 m | 849 pts 4.80 m | 642 pts 53.61 m | 722 pts 4:33.52 min |
| 3 | Dmitriy Karpov (KAZ) | 8586 (SB) | 929 pts 10.70 s | 859 pts 7.19 m | 856 pts 16.08 m | 859 pts 2.06 m | 936 pts 47.44 s | 971 pts 14.03 s | 849 pts 48.95 m | 910 pts 5.00 m | 735 pts 59.84 m | 682 pts 4:39.68 min |
| 4 | Aleksey Drozdov (RUS) | 8475 (PB) | 867 pts 10.97 s | 874 pts 7.25 m | 882 pts 16.49 m | 915 pts 2.12 m | 815 pts 50.00 s | 879 pts 14.76 s | 842 pts 48.62 m | 910 pts 5.00 m | 791 pts 65.51 m | 700 pts 4:36.93 min |
| 5 | André Niklaus (GER) | 8371 (PB) | 834 pts 11.12 s | 915 pts 7.42 m | 736 pts 14.12 m | 859 pts 2.06 m | 842 pts 49.40 s | 910 pts 14.51 s | 756 pts 44.48 m | 1004 pts 5.30 m | 787 pts 63.28 m | 728 pts 4:32.50 min |
| 6 | Aleksey Sysoyev (RUS) | 8357 (PB) | 906 pts 10.80 s | 816 pts 7.01 m | 861 pts 16.16 m | 831 pts 2.03 m | 889 pts 48.42 s | 900 pts 14.59 s | 865 pts 49.76 m | 880 pts 4.90 m | 704 pts 57.75 m | 705 pts 4:36.16 min |
| 7 | Romain Barras (FRA) | 8262 | 782 pts 11.36 s | 845 pts 7.13 m | 792 pts 15.03 m | 803 pts 2.00 m | 846 pts 49.32 s | 929 pts 14.36 s | 757 pts 44.51 m | 910 pts 5.00 m | 825 pts 65.74 m | 773 pts 4:25.75 min |
| 8 | Yordanis García (CUB) | 8257 (NR) | 922 pts 10.73 s | 850 pts 7.15 m | 786 pts 14.94 m | 887 pts 2.09 m | 849 pts 49.25 s | 964 pts 14.08 s | 724 pts 42.91 m | 819 pts 4.70 m | 870 pts 68.74 m | 586 pts 4:55.42 min |
| 9 | Arthur Abele (GER) | 8243 | 890 pts 10.87 s | 854 pts 7.17 m | 703 pts 13.58 m | 803 pts 2.00 m | 881 pts 48.58 s | 985 pts 13.92 s | 691 pts 41.28 m | 819 pts 4.70 m | 817 pts 65.24 m | 800 pts 4:21.69 min |
| 10 | Paul Terek (USA) | 8120 | 872 pts 10.95 s | 876 pts 7.26 m | 778 pts 14.81 m | 803 pts 2.00 m | 845 pts 49.34 s | 837 pts 15.10 s | 763 pts 44.81 m | 972 pts 5.20 m | 677 pts 55.96 m | 697 pts 4:37.38 min |
| 11 | Hans van Alphen (BEL) | 8034 | 836 pts 11.11 s | 898 pts 7.35 m | 769 pts 14.67 m | 696 pts 1.88 m | 884 pts 48.52 s | 878 pts 14.77 s | 752 pts 44.30 m | 702 pts 4.30 m | 824 pts 65.71 m | 795 pts 4:22.50 min |
| 12 | Attila Zsivoczky (HUN) | 8017 (SB) | 765 pts 11.44 s | 814 pts 7.00 m | 798 pts 15.13 m | 887 pts 2.09 m | 788 pts 50.58 s | 871 pts 14.82 s | 804 pts 46.80 m | 849 pts 4.80 m | 732 pts 59.63 m | 709 pts 4:35.55 min |
| 13 | Robert Jacob Arnold (USA) | 8004 | 830 pts 11.14 s | 781 pts 6.86 m | 773 pts 14.73 m | 859 pts 2.06 m | 860 pts 49.02 s | 884 pts 14.72 s | 740 pts 43.70 m | 941 pts 5.10 m | 678 pts 56.01 m | 658 pts 4:43.58 min |
| 14 | Aliaksandr Parkhomenka (BLR) | 7984 | 797 pts 11.29 s | 795 pts 6.92 m | 850 pts 15.98 m | 749 pts 1.94 m | 762 pts 51.16 s | 858 pts 14.93 s | 764 pts 44.86 m | 819 pts 4.70 m | 876 pts 69.14 m | 714 pts 4:34.63 min |
| 15 | François Gourmet (BEL) | 7974 (PB) | 935 pts 10.67 s | 850 pts 7.15 m | 712 pts 13.74 m | 670 pts 1.85 m | 910 pts 47.98 s | 847 pts 15.02 s | 662 pts 39.87 m | 910 pts 5.00 m | 704 pts 57.73 m | 774 pts 4:25.51 min |
| 16 | Andres Raja (EST) | 7794 | 878 pts 10.92 s | 915 pts 7.42 m | 744 pts 14.26 m | 670 pts 1.85 m | 866 pts 48.89 s | 910 pts 14.51 s | 605 pts 37.07 m | 819 pts 4.70 m | 743 pts 60.34 m | 644 pts 4:45.83 min |
| 17 | Agustín Félix (ESP) | 7749 | 823 pts 11.17 s | 842 pts 7.12 m | 685 pts 13.29 m | 831 pts 2.03 m | 721 pts 52.08 s | 880 pts 14.75 s | 740 pts 43.67 m | 910 pts 5.00 m | 688 pts 56.69 m | 629 pts 4:48.27 min |
| 18 | Alberto Juantorena (CUB) | 7657 | 832 pts 11.13 s | 918 pts 7.43 m | 700 pts 13.54 m | 887 pts 2.09 m | 798 pts 50.37 s | 853 pts 14.97 s | 699 pts 41.69 m | 673 pts 4.20 m | 682 pts 56.28 m | 615 pts 4:50.69 min |
| 19 | Hiromasa Tanaka (JPN) | 7629 | 850 pts 11.05 s | 762 pts 6.78 m | 602 pts 11.92 m | 696 pts 1.88 m | 881 pts 48.59 s | 787 pts 15.53 s | 698 pts 41.65 m | 941 pts 5.10 m | 732 pts 59.59 m | 680 pts 4:40.04 min |
| 20 | Josef Karas (CZE) | 7625 | 835 pts 11.12 s | 920 pts 7.44 m | 681 pts 13.23 m | 749 pts 1.94 m | 787 pts 50.60 s | 829 pts 15.17 s | 779 pts 45.58 m | 731 pts 4.40 m | 578 pts 49.28 m | 737 pts 4:31.21 min |
| 21 | Kun-Woo Kim (KOR) | 7531 (SB) | 797 pts 11.29 s | 842 pts 7.12 m | 657 pts 12.83 m | 723 pts 1.91 m | 862 pts 48.99 s | 863 pts 14.89 s | 588 pts 36.23 m | 849 pts 4.80 m | 512 pts 44.79 m | 838 pts 4:16.16 min |
| 22 | Norman Müller (GER) | 7344 | 883 pts 10.90 s | 920 pts 7.44 m | 801 pts 15.18 m | 776 pts 1.97 m | 930 pts 47.58 s | 885 pts 14.71 s | 685 pts 40.99 m | 0 pts NM | 722 pts 58.93 m | 742 pts 4:30.38 min |
| 23 | Hans Olav Uldal (NOR) | 6698 | 814 pts 11.21 s | 797 pts 6.93 m | 707 pts 13.65 m | 644 pts 1.82 m | 783 pts 50.70 s | 8 pts 27.24 s | 773 pts 45.31 m | 760 pts 4.50 m | 762 pts 61.63 m | 650 pts 4:44.91 min |
| | Hamdi Dhouibi (TUN) | DNF | 876 pts 10.93 s | 826 pts 7.05 m | 692 pts 13.40 m | 644 pts 1.82 m | 929 pts 47.59 s | 912 pts 14.49 s | 754 pts 44.37 m | 819 pts 4.70 m | — | — |
| | Carlos Chinin (BRA) | DNF | 899 pts 10.93 s | 876 pts 7.26 m | 650 pts 12.72 m | 831 pts 2.03 m | 900 pts 49.18 s | 911 pts 14.50 s | 625 pts 38.06 m | No mark | — | — |
| | Tom Pappas (USA) | DNF | 870 pts 10.96 s | 920 pts 7.44 m | 870 pts 16.31 m | 831 pts 2.03 m | 851 pts 49.22 s | 869 pts 14.84 s | — | — | — | — |
| | Bryan Clay (USA) | DNF | 989 pts 10.44 s | 972 pts 7.65 m | 821 pts 15.51 m | 776 pts 1.97 m | — | — | — | — | — | — |
| | Eugene Martineau (NED) | DNF | 806 pts 11.25 s | 854 pts 7.13 m | 709 pts 13.69 m | 803 pts 2.00 m | 797 pts 50.38 s | — | — | — | — | — |
| | Vitaliy Smirnov (UZB) | DNF | 0 pts DNF | — | — | — | — | — | — | — | — | — |
| | Andrei Krauchanka (BLR) | DNF | 0 pts DQ | 995 pts 7.58 m | — | — | — | — | — | — | — | — |
WR world record | AR area record | CR championship record | GR games record | NR national record | OR Olympic record | PB personal best | SB season best | WL world leading (in a given season)

== See also ==
- Athletics at the 2007 Pan American Games – Men's decathlon
- Athletics at the 2007 Summer Universiade – Men's decathlon
