= 2004 in the decathlon =

This page lists the World Best Year Performance in the year 2004 in the men's decathlon. The main event during this season were the 2004 Olympic Games in Athens, Greece, where the competition started on August 23, 2004, and ended on August 24, 2004, in the Athens Olympic Stadium.

== Records ==
Standing records prior to the 2004 season in track and field
World Record	Roman Šebrle (CZE)	9026	May 27, 2001	Götzis, Austria

== 2004 World Year Ranking ==
Rank	Points	Athlete	Venue	Date	Note
1	8893	Roman Šebrle (CZE)	Athens, Greece	2004-08-24	
2	8820	Bryan Clay (USA)	Athens, Greece	2004-08-24	
3	8732	Tom Pappas (USA)	Götzis, Austria	2004-05-30	
4	8725	Dmitriy Karpov (KAZ)	Athens, Greece	2004-08-24	
5	8414	Dean Macey (GBR)	Athens, Greece	2004-08-24	
6	8343	Chiel Warners (NED)	Athens, Greece	2004-08-24	
7	8317	Erki Nool (EST)	Götzis, Austria	2004-05-30	
8	8312	Paul Terek (USA)	Sacramento, United States	2004-07-17	
9	8287	Attila Zsivoczky (HUN)	Athens, Greece	2004-08-24	
10	8285	Phillip McMullen (USA)	Sacramento, United States	2004-07-17	
11	8240	Lev Lobodin (RUS)	Götzis, Austria	2004-05-30	
12	8237	Laurent Hernu (FRA)	Athens, Greece	2004-08-24	
13	8225	Claston Bernard (JAM)	Athens, Greece	2004-08-24	
14	8211	Tomáš Dvořák (CZE)	Götzis, Austria	2004-05-30	
15	8172	Dennis Leyckes (GER)	Ratingen, Germany	2004-06-27	
16	8171	Ryan Harlan (USA)	Austin, United States	2004-06-12	
17	8102	Roland Schwarzl (AUT)	Athens, Greece	2004-08-24	
18	8084	Aleksandr Pogorelov (RUS)	Athens, Greece	2004-08-24	
19	8082	Eugène Martineau (NED)	Götzis, Austria	2004-05-30	
20	8077	Florian Schönbeck (GER)	Athens, Greece	2004-08-24	
21	8067	Romain Barras (FRA)	Athens, Greece	2004-08-24	
22	8056	Paolo Casarsa (ITA)	Vienna, Austria	2004-06-06	
23	8048	Nikolay Averyanov (RUS)	Tula, Russia	2004-06-24	
24	8045	Christopher Hallmann (GER)	Vaterstetten, Germany	2004-09-05	
25	8043	Nikolay Tishchenko (RUS)	Krasnodar, Russia	2004-05-29	

== See also ==
- 2004 Décastar
- 2004 Hypo-Meeting
