= Athletics at the 2006 Asian Games – Men's decathlon =

Men's decathlon at the 2006 Asian Games
- Venue: Khalifa International Stadium
- Date: 10–11 December 2006
- Competitors: 15 from 12 nations

Medalists
gold medal	Dmitriy Karpov	Kazakhstan
silver medal	Vitaliy Smirnov	Uzbekistan
bronze medal	Kim Kun-woo	South Korea

The men's decathlon competition at the 2006 Asian Games in Doha, Qatar was held on 10–11 December 2006 at the Khalifa International Stadium.

== Schedule ==
All times are Arabia Standard Time (UTC+03:00)

Date	Time	Event
Sunday, 10 December 2006	09:00	100 metres
Sunday, 10 December 2006	10:10	Long jump
Sunday, 10 December 2006	11:30	Shot put
Sunday, 10 December 2006	16:20	High jump
Sunday, 10 December 2006	18:15	400 metres
Monday, 11 December 2006	09:00	110 metres hurdles
Monday, 11 December 2006	09:50	Discus throw
Monday, 11 December 2006	11:00	Pole vault
Monday, 11 December 2006	16:00	Javelin throw
Monday, 11 December 2006	18:55	1500 metres

== Records ==
Prior to this competition, the existing world, Asian and Games records were as follows.

World Record	Roman Šebrle (CZE)	9026	Götzis, Austria	27 May 2001
Asian Record	Dmitriy Karpov (KAZ)	8725	Athens, Greece	24 August 2004
Games Record	Oleg Veretelnikov (UZB)	8278	Bangkok, Thailand	18 December 1998

== Results ==
Legend

- DNF — Did not finish
- DNS — Did not start
- NM — No mark

=== 100 metres ===
- Wind – Heat 1: +0.6 m/s
- Wind – Heat 2: +0.1 m/s

Rank	Heat	Athlete	Time	Points	Notes
1	2	Dmitriy Karpov (KAZ)	10.81	903	
2	2	P. J. Vinod (IND)	10.93	876	
3	2	Hadi Sepehrzad (IRI)	10.94	874	
4	1	Hiromasa Tanaka (JPN)	11.01	858	
4	1	Ahmad Hassan Moussa (QAT)	11.01	858	
4	2	Vũ Văn Huyện (VIE)	11.01	858	
7	1	Vitaliy Smirnov (UZB)	11.10	838	
8	2	Hsiao Szu-pin (TPE)	11.13	832	
9	1	Ali Hazer (LIB)	11.24	808	
10	1	Kim Kun-woo (KOR)	11.26	804	
11	1	Pavel Dubitskiy (KAZ)	11.37	780	
12	2	Pavel Andreev (UZB)	11.89	673	
13	2	Qi Haifeng (CHN)	24.45	0	
—	1	Saad Al-Bishi (KSA)	DNS		
—	2	Mohammed Al-Qaree (KSA)	DNS		

=== Long jump ===
Rank	Athlete	Attempt			Result	Points	Notes
Rank	Athlete	1	2	3	Result	Points	Notes
1	Dmitriy Karpov (KAZ)	7.53 +1.5	7.63 +0.6	7.49 +0.7	7.63	967	
2	Kim Kun-woo (KOR)	7.16 −0.1	7.33 +0.4	5.39 +0.4	7.33	893	
3	Vũ Văn Huyện (VIE)	X	7.29 +1.9	X	7.29	883	
4	Pavel Dubitskiy (KAZ)	7.13 +0.7	7.09 +1.0	—	7.13	845	
5	P. J. Vinod (IND)	6.96 −0.1	7.11 −1.9	6.92 +0.1	7.11	840	
6	Hsiao Szu-pin (TPE)	6.96; 0.0	7.08 +1.4	6.88 +1.2	7.08	833	
7	Ahmad Hassan Moussa (QAT)	6.93 +0.2	7.02 +0.5	6.92 −0.9	7.02	818	
8	Vitaliy Smirnov (UZB)	6.79 +1.1	6.81; 0.0	6.74 +0.9	6.81	769	
9	Hiromasa Tanaka (JPN)	6.79 +1.8	6.62 +0.8	6.64 +0.3	6.79	764	
10	Hadi Sepehrzad (IRI)	4.83 +1.9	6.45 −0.8	6.30 +0.8	6.45	686	
11	Pavel Andreev (UZB)	6.44 +0.9	6.06 +1.1	X	6.44	684	
12	Ali Hazer (LIB)	6.33 −0.8	6.15 +0.2	5.77 −0.1	6.33	659	
—	Qi Haifeng (CHN)				DNS		

=== Shot put ===
Rank	Athlete	Attempt			Result	Points	Notes
Rank	Athlete	1	2	3	Result	Points	Notes
1	Dmitriy Karpov (KAZ)	16.41	16.14	X	16.41	877	
2	Hadi Sepehrzad (IRI)	15.26	X	15.15	15.26	806	
3	Vitaliy Smirnov (UZB)	14.54	15.02	X	15.02	791	
4	Pavel Andreev (UZB)	12.85	13.48	13.55	13.55	701	
5	Hsiao Szu-pin (TPE)	13.38	13.04	13.55	13.55	701	
6	Ahmad Hassan Moussa (QAT)	13.48	X	13.45	13.48	697	
7	P. J. Vinod (IND)	13.24	12.98	13.29	13.29	685	
8	Pavel Dubitskiy (KAZ)	13.15	12.75	12.25	13.15	676	
9	Kim Kun-woo (KOR)	12.68	12.45	12.20	12.68	648	
10	Hiromasa Tanaka (JPN)	10.35	X	11.10	11.10	552	
11	Vũ Văn Huyện (VIE)	10.51	10.35	10.30	10.51	516	
12	Ali Hazer (LIB)	X	9.25	10.28	10.28	502	

=== High jump ===
Rank	Athlete	Attempt										Result	Points	Notes
Rank	Athlete	1.70	1.73	1.76	1.79	1.82	1.85	1.88	1.91	1.94	1.97	Result	Points	Notes
Rank	Athlete	2.00	2.03	2.06	2.09							Result	Points	Notes
1	Pavel Dubitskiy (KAZ)	–	–	–	–	–	–	O	–	O	–	2.06	859	
1	Pavel Dubitskiy (KAZ)	XO	–	XXO	XXX							2.06	859	
2	Dmitriy Karpov (KAZ)	–	–	–	–	–	–	O	–	O	XO	2.03	831	
2	Dmitriy Karpov (KAZ)	XO	O	XXX								2.03	831	
3	Hsiao Szu-pin (TPE)	–	–	–	–	–	–	–	O	O	XO	2.00	803	
3	Hsiao Szu-pin (TPE)	XO	XXX									2.00	803	
4	Kim Kun-woo (KOR)	–	–	–	–	–	O	–	O	XO	O	1.97	776	
4	Kim Kun-woo (KOR)	XXX										1.97	776	
5	Vitaliy Smirnov (UZB)	–	–	–	–	–	O	O	O	XXO	XXO	1.97	776	
5	Vitaliy Smirnov (UZB)	XXX										1.97	776	
6	Vũ Văn Huyện (VIE)	–	–	–	XXO	O	XXO	XO	O	XXX		1.91	723	
7	P. J. Vinod (IND)	–	–	O	–	XXO	O	XO	XXO	XXX		1.91	723	
8	Pavel Andreev (UZB)	–	–	–	–	–	O	XO	XXX			1.88	723	
9	Hadi Sepehrzad (IRI)	–	–	–	–	XXO	O	XXX				1.85	670	
10	Hiromasa Tanaka (JPN)	O	–	XO	O	XXO	XXX					1.82	644	
11	Ali Hazer (LIB)	XO	O	O	O	XXX						1.79	619	
12	Ahmad Hassan Moussa (QAT)	O	XXO	XO	XXX							1.76	593	

=== 400 metres ===
Rank	Heat	Athlete	Time	Points	Notes
1	1	Dmitriy Karpov (KAZ)	48.28	896	
2	2	Kim Kun-woo (KOR)	48.36	892	
3	1	P. J. Vinod (IND)	48.91	866	
4	2	Vitaliy Smirnov (UZB)	49.21	851	
5	2	Ahmad Hassan Moussa (QAT)	49.69	829	
6	1	Vũ Văn Huyện (VIE)	50.12	809	
7	2	Hiromasa Tanaka (JPN)	50.24	804	
8	1	Hadi Sepehrzad (IRI)	51.04	767	
9	1	Hsiao Szu-pin (TPE)	51.25	758	
10	2	Ali Hazer (LIB)	51.43	750	
11	2	Pavel Dubitskiy (KAZ)	51.97	726	
12	1	Pavel Andreev (UZB)	52.98	682	

=== 110 metres hurdles ===
- Wind – Heat 1: +0.3 m/s
- Wind – Heat 2: −0.6 m/s

Rank	Heat	Athlete	Time	Points	Notes
1	1	Dmitriy Karpov (KAZ)	14.47	915	
2	2	Ahmad Hassan Moussa (QAT)	14.99	851	
3	1	Vitaliy Smirnov (UZB)	15.02	847	
4	2	P. J. Vinod (IND)	15.07	841	
5	2	Kim Kun-woo (KOR)	15.10	837	
6	2	Pavel Dubitskiy (KAZ)	15.33	810	
7	1	Hadi Sepehrzad (IRI)	15.35	808	
8	1	Hsiao Szu-pin (TPE)	15.46	795	
9	1	Hiromasa Tanaka (JPN)	15.64	774	
10	2	Ali Hazer (LIB)	15.96	737	
11	2	Pavel Andreev (UZB)	16.07	725	
—	1	Vũ Văn Huyện (VIE)	DNS		

=== Discus throw ===
Rank	Athlete	Attempt			Result	Points	Notes
Rank	Athlete	1	2	3	Result	Points	Notes
1	Dmitriy Karpov (KAZ)	45.52	45.06	47.87	47.87	826	
2	Hadi Sepehrzad (IRI)	46.75	X	40.62	46.75	803	
3	Vitaliy Smirnov (UZB)	41.55	42.22	43.54	43.54	737	
4	Hsiao Szu-pin (TPE)	42.27	X	40.19	42.27	711	
5	Hiromasa Tanaka (JPN)	40.95	37.30	41.46	41.46	694	
6	Pavel Andreev (UZB)	41.25	40.59	X	41.25	690	
7	Ahmad Hassan Moussa (QAT)	22.71	40.17	X	40.17	668	
8	Pavel Dubitskiy (KAZ)	39.32	X	38.51	39.32	651	
9	Kim Kun-woo (KOR)	35.01	37.03	X	37.03	604	
10	P. J. Vinod (IND)	33.35	32.42	30.87	33.35	531	
11	Ali Hazer (LIB)	X	29.54	X	29.54	455	

=== Pole vault ===
Rank	Athlete	Attempt										Result	Points	Notes
Rank	Athlete	3.50	3.60	3.70	3.80	3.90	4.00	4.10	4.20	4.30	4.40	Result	Points	Notes
Rank	Athlete	4.50	4.60	4.70	4.80	4.90	5.00					Result	Points	Notes
1	Dmitriy Karpov (KAZ)	–	–	–	–	–	–	–	–	–	O	4.80	849	
1	Dmitriy Karpov (KAZ)	–	O	–	XO	–	XXX					4.80	849	
2	Pavel Dubitskiy (KAZ)	–	–	–	–	–	–	–	O	–	O	4.60	790	
2	Pavel Dubitskiy (KAZ)	–	O	XXX								4.60	790	
3	Kim Kun-woo (KOR)	–	–	–	–	–	–	–	XO	–	O	4.60	790	
3	Kim Kun-woo (KOR)	–	O	XXX								4.60	790	
4	Vitaliy Smirnov (UZB)	–	–	–	–	–	–	–	O	–	XO	4.50	760	
4	Vitaliy Smirnov (UZB)	O	XXX									4.50	760	
5	P. J. Vinod (IND)	–	–	–	–	–	O	–	XXO	XXO	O	4.40	731	
5	P. J. Vinod (IND)	XXX										4.40	731	
6	Ahmad Hassan Moussa (QAT)	O	–	O	–	O	O	XXO	XO	XXX		4.20	673	
7	Pavel Andreev (UZB)	–	–	–	–	–	O	–	–	XXX		4.00	617	
8	Hadi Sepehrzad (IRI)	O	XXO	O	XO	–	XXX					3.80	562	
—	Hsiao Szu-pin (TPE)	–	–	–	–	–	–	–	–	–	XXX	NM	0	
—	Hiromasa Tanaka (JPN)	–	–	–	–	–	–	–	–	–	XXX	NM	0	
—	Ali Hazer (LIB)	XXX										NM	0	

=== Javelin throw ===
Rank	Athlete	Attempt			Result	Points	Notes
Rank	Athlete	1	2	3	Result	Points	Notes
1	Ahmad Hassan Moussa (QAT)	61.05	62.16	61.27	62.16	770	
2	Pavel Andreev (UZB)	51.26	52.29	59.28	59.28	727	
3	Vitaliy Smirnov (UZB)	X	57.43	58.24	58.24	711	
4	Dmitriy Karpov (KAZ)	50.54	51.18	56.66	56.66	688	
5	Hiromasa Tanaka (JPN)	55.04	56.42	X	56.42	684	
6	Hsiao Szu-pin (TPE)	55.36	55.22	50.54	55.36	668	
7	Pavel Dubitskiy (KAZ)	50.45	—	—	50.45	595	
8	P. J. Vinod (IND)	45.68	45.70	48.87	48.87	572	
9	Kim Kun-woo (KOR)	46.34	48.65	46.73	48.65	569	
10	Hadi Sepehrzad (IRI)	46.41	—	—	46.41	536	
11	Ali Hazer (LIB)	X	36.04	38.00	38.00	413	

=== 1500 metres ===
Rank	Athlete	Time	Points	Notes
1	Kim Kun-woo (KOR)	4:14.20	852	
2	Vitaliy Smirnov (UZB)	4:38.67	689	
3	Ahmad Hassan Moussa (QAT)	4:38.83	688	
4	Pavel Andreev (UZB)	4:44.82	650	
5	Pavel Dubitskiy (KAZ)	4:46.11	642	
6	Dmitriy Karpov (KAZ)	4:47.74	632	
7	P. J. Vinod (IND)	4:48.20	630	
8	Hiromasa Tanaka (JPN)	4:56.53	580	
9	Ali Hazer (LIB)	5:11.26	497	
10	Hadi Sepehrzad (IRI)	5:14.28	480	
11	Hsiao Szu-pin (TPE)	5:19.84	451	

=== Summary ===
Rank	Athlete	100m	LJ	SP	HJ	400m	110mH	DT	PV	JT	1500m	Total	Notes
1st place, gold medalist(s)	Dmitriy Karpov (KAZ)	903	967	877	831	896	915	826	849	688	632	8384	GR
2nd place, silver medalist(s)	Vitaliy Smirnov (UZB)	838	769	791	776	851	847	737	760	711	689	7769	
3rd place, bronze medalist(s)	Kim Kun-woo (KOR)	804	893	648	776	892	837	604	790	569	852	7665	
4	Ahmad Hassan Moussa (QAT)	858	818	697	593	829	851	668	673	770	688	7445	
5	Pavel Dubitskiy (KAZ)	780	845	676	859	726	810	651	790	595	642	7374	
6	P. J. Vinod (IND)	876	840	685	723	866	841	531	731	572	630	7295	
7	Hadi Sepehrzad (IRI)	874	686	806	670	767	808	803	562	536	480	6992	
8	Pavel Andreev (UZB)	673	684	701	696	682	725	690	617	727	650	6845	
9	Hsiao Szu-pin (TPE)	832	833	701	803	758	795	711	0	668	451	6552	
10	Hiromasa Tanaka (JPN)	858	764	552	644	804	774	694	0	684	580	6354	
11	Ali Hazer (LIB)	808	659	502	619	750	737	455	0	413	497	5440	
—	Vũ Văn Huyện (VIE)	858	883	516	723	809	DNS					DNF	
—	Qi Haifeng (CHN)	0	DNS									DNF	
—	Saad Al-Bishi (KSA)											DNS	
—	Mohammed Al-Qaree (KSA)											DNS	
