= 2003 in the decathlon =

This page lists the World Best Year Performance in the year 2003 in the men's decathlon. One of the main events during this season were the 2003 World Championships in Paris, France, where the competition started on Monday, August 26, 2003, and ended on Tuesday, August 27, 2003.

== Records ==
Standing records prior to the 2003 season in track and field
World Record	Roman Šebrle (CZE)	9026	May 27, 2001	Götzis, Austria

== 2003 World Year Ranking ==
Rank	Points	Athlete	Venue	Date	Note
1	8807	Roman Šebrle (CZE)	Götzis, Austria	2003-06-01	
2	8784	Tom Pappas (USA)	Palo Alto, United States	2003-06-22	
3	8482	Bryan Clay (USA)	Palo Alto, United States	2003-06-22	
4	8374	Dmitriy Karpov (KAZ)	Paris, France	2003-08-27	
5	8281	Erki Nool (EST)	Tallinn, Estonia	2003-07-06	
6	8275	Paul Terek (USA)	Palo Alto, United States	2003-06-22	
7	8242	Tomáš Dvořák (CZE)	Paris, France	2003-08-27	
8	8222	Jón Arnar Magnússon (ISL)	Götzis, Austria	2003-06-01	
9	8219	Laurent Hernu (FRA)	Talence, France	2003-09-21	
10	8203	Kristjan Rahnu (EST)	Tartu, Estonia	2003-07-20	
11	8198	Lev Lobodin (RUS)	Paris, France	2003-08-27	
12	8196	Romain Barras (FRA)	Daegu, South Korea	2003-08-29	
13	8126	Qi Haifeng (CHN)	Paris, France	2003-08-27	
14	8122	Indrek Turi (EST)	Daegu, South Korea	2003-08-29	
15	8072	Aleksandr Pogorelov (RUS)	Arles, France	2003-06-08	
16	8061	Stephen Harris (USA)	Sacramento, United States	2003-06-12	
17	8060	Chiel Warners (NED)	Tallinn, Estonia	2003-07-06	
18	8020	André Niklaus (GER)	Paris, France	2003-08-27	
19	8019	Rolf Schläfli (SUI)	Götzis, Austria	2003-06-01	
20	8010	Stephen Moore (USA)	Palo Alto, United States	2003-06-22	
21	8000	Claston Bernard (JAM)	Paris, France	2003-08-27	
22	7980	Klaus Ambrosch (AUT)	Götzis, Austria	2003-06-01	
23	7964	Sébastien Levicq (FRA)	Arles, France	2003-06-08	
24	7958	Sebastian Knabe (GER)	Götzis, Austria	2003-06-01	
25	7954	Aliaksandr Parkhomenka (BLR)	Minsk, Belarus	2003-05-23	

== See also ==
- 2003 Hypo-Meeting
