= Athletics at the 2002 Asian Games – Men's decathlon =

Men's decathlon at the 2002 Asian Games
- Venue: Busan Asiad Main Stadium
- Dates: 9–10 October 2002
- Competitors: 9 from 7 nations

Medalists
| gold medal | Qi Haifeng | China |
| silver medal | Dmitriy Karpov | Kazakhstan |
| bronze medal | Ahmad Hassan Moussa | Qatar |

The Men's decathlon competition at the 2002 Asian Games in Busan, South Korea was held on 9–10 October at the Busan Asiad Main Stadium.

== Schedule ==
All times are Korea Standard Time (UTC+09:00)

| Date | Time | Event |
|---|---|---|
| Wednesday, 9 October 2002 | 09:00 | 100 metres |
| Wednesday, 9 October 2002 | 10:00 | Long jump |
| Wednesday, 9 October 2002 | 12:30 | Shot put |
| Wednesday, 9 October 2002 | 14:30 | High jump |
| Wednesday, 9 October 2002 | 16:30 | 400 metres |
| Thursday, 10 October 2002 | 09:00 | 110 metres hurdles |
| Thursday, 10 October 2002 | 09:50 | Discus throw |
| Thursday, 10 October 2002 | 12:00 | Pole vault |
| Thursday, 10 October 2002 | 15:00 | Javelin throw |
| Thursday, 10 October 2002 | 16:30 | 1500 metres |

== Records ==
Prior to this competition, the existing world, Asian and Games records were as follows.

| World Record | Roman Šebrle (CZE) | 9026 | Götzis, Austria | 27 May 2001 |
| Asian Record | Ramil Ganiyev (UZB) | 8445 | Athens, Greece | 6 August 1997 |
| Games Record | Oleg Veretelnikov (UZB) | 8278 | Bangkok, Thailand | 18 December 1998 |

== Results ==
Legend

- DNF — Did not finish
- DNS — Did not start

=== 100 metres ===
- Wind – Heat 1: +0.2 m/s
- Wind – Heat 2: −0.6 m/s

| Rank | Heat | Athlete | Time | Points | Notes |
|---|---|---|---|---|---|
| 1 | 2 | Ahmad Hassan Moussa (QAT) | 10.94 | 874 | |
| 2 | 1 | Qi Haifeng (CHN) | 11.09 | 841 | |
| 3 | 1 | Masatoshi Ishizawa (JPN) | 11.21 | 814 | |
| 3 | 2 | Dmitriy Karpov (KAZ) | 11.21 | 814 | |
| 5 | 1 | Vitaliy Smirnov (UZB) | 11.29 | 797 | |
| 6 | 2 | Kim Kun-woo (KOR) | 11.42 | 769 | |
| 7 | 2 | Chen Chien-hung (TPE) | 11.49 | 755 | |
| 8 | 1 | Kim Tae-keun (KOR) | 11.58 | 736 | |
| 9 | 1 | Pavel Andreev (UZB) | 11.84 | 683 | |

=== Long jump ===
| Rank | Athlete | Result | Points | Notes |
|---|---|---|---|---|
| 1 | Dmitriy Karpov (KAZ) | 7.57 −1.1 | 952 | |
| 2 | Qi Haifeng (CHN) | 7.22; 0.0 | 866 | |
| 3 | Kim Kun-woo (KOR) | 7.12 −0.4 | 842 | |
| 4 | Ahmad Hassan Moussa (QAT) | 7.03 −0.4 | 821 | |
| 5 | Chen Chien-hung (TPE) | 6.96 −1.6 | 804 | |
| 6 | Masatoshi Ishizawa (JPN) | 6.85 −0.6 | 778 | |
| 6 | Vitaliy Smirnov (UZB) | 6.85 −0.6 | 778 | |
| 8 | Pavel Andreev (UZB) | 6.80 −0.2 | 767 | |
| 9 | Kim Tae-keun (KOR) | 6.64 −0.8 | 729 | |

=== Shot put ===
| Rank | Athlete | Result | Points | Notes |
|---|---|---|---|---|
| 1 | Pavel Andreev (UZB) | 15.14 | 798 | |
| 2 | Ahmad Hassan Moussa (QAT) | 14.43 | 755 | |
| 3 | Vitaliy Smirnov (UZB) | 14.33 | 749 | |
| 4 | Dmitriy Karpov (KAZ) | 14.17 | 739 | |
| 5 | Qi Haifeng (CHN) | 13.05 | 670 | |
| 6 | Chen Chien-hung (TPE) | 12.61 | 643 | |
| 7 | Kim Tae-keun (KOR) | 12.57 | 641 | |
| 8 | Kim Kun-woo (KOR) | 11.97 | 605 | |
| 9 | Masatoshi Ishizawa (JPN) | 11.19 | 557 | |

=== High jump ===
| Rank | Athlete | Result | Points | Notes |
|---|---|---|---|---|
| 1 | Dmitriy Karpov (KAZ) | 2.09 | 887 | |
| 2 | Qi Haifeng (CHN) | 2.06 | 859 | |
| 3 | Kim Kun-woo (KOR) | 2.03 | 831 | |
| 4 | Chen Chien-hung (TPE) | 1.97 | 776 | |
| 5 | Pavel Andreev (UZB) | 1.94 | 749 | |
| 6 | Vitaliy Smirnov (UZB) | 1.94 | 749 | |
| 7 | Kim Tae-keun (KOR) | 1.88 | 696 | |
| 8 | Masatoshi Ishizawa (JPN) | 1.88 | 696 | |
| 9 | Ahmad Hassan Moussa (QAT) | 1.85 | 670 | |

=== 400 metres ===
| Rank | Heat | Athlete | Time | Points | Notes |
|---|---|---|---|---|---|
| 1 | 1 | Ahmad Hassan Moussa (QAT) | 48.43 | 888 | |
| 2 | 2 | Masatoshi Ishizawa (JPN) | 48.54 | 883 | |
| 3 | 1 | Dmitriy Karpov (KAZ) | 48.71 | 875 | |
| 4 | 1 | Kim Kun-woo (KOR) | 49.06 | 858 | |
| 5 | 2 | Qi Haifeng (CHN) | 49.09 | 857 | |
| 6 | 1 | Vitaliy Smirnov (UZB) | 50.00 | 815 | |
| 7 | 1 | Chen Chien-hung (TPE) | 50.36 | 798 | |
| 8 | 2 | Pavel Andreev (UZB) | 51.89 | 730 | |
| 9 | 2 | Kim Tae-keun (KOR) | 52.80 | 690 | |

=== 110 metres hurdles ===
- Wind – Heat 1: 0.0 m/s
- Wind – Heat 2: 0.0 m/s

| Rank | Heat | Athlete | Time | Points | Notes |
|---|---|---|---|---|---|
| 1 | 1 | Qi Haifeng (CHN) | 14.54 | 906 | |
| 1 | 2 | Dmitriy Karpov (KAZ) | 14.54 | 906 | |
| 3 | 1 | Ahmad Hassan Moussa (QAT) | 14.72 | 884 | |
| 4 | 2 | Masatoshi Ishizawa (JPN) | 14.73 | 882 | |
| 5 | 2 | Kim Tae-keun (KOR) | 15.40 | 802 | |
| 6 | 1 | Pavel Andreev (UZB) | 15.56 | 783 | |
| 7 | 1 | Kim Kun-woo (KOR) | 15.74 | 762 | |
| 8 | 2 | Chen Chien-hung (TPE) | 15.76 | 760 | |
| 9 | 1 | Vitaliy Smirnov (UZB) | 16.00 | 733 | |

=== Discus throw ===
| Rank | Athlete | Result | Points | Notes |
|---|---|---|---|---|
| 1 | Dmitriy Karpov (KAZ) | 46.69 | 802 | |
| 2 | Qi Haifeng (CHN) | 43.16 | 729 | |
| 3 | Vitaliy Smirnov (UZB) | 43.06 | 727 | |
| 4 | Pavel Andreev (UZB) | 42.91 | 724 | |
| 5 | Kim Tae-keun (KOR) | 40.99 | 685 | |
| 6 | Chen Chien-hung (TPE) | 40.32 | 671 | |
| 7 | Ahmad Hassan Moussa (QAT) | 38.12 | 626 | |
| 8 | Masatoshi Ishizawa (JPN) | 36.49 | 594 | |
| 9 | Kim Kun-woo (KOR) | 34.14 | 546 | |

=== Pole vault ===
| Rank | Athlete | Result | Points | Notes |
|---|---|---|---|---|
| 1 | Qi Haifeng (CHN) | 4.80 | 849 | |
| 2 | Pavel Andreev (UZB) | 4.80 | 849 | |
| 3 | Masatoshi Ishizawa (JPN) | 4.70 | 819 | |
| 4 | Kim Kun-woo (KOR) | 4.70 | 819 | |
| 5 | Dmitriy Karpov (KAZ) | 4.60 | 790 | |
| 6 | Vitaliy Smirnov (UZB) | 4.40 | 731 | |
| 7 | Chen Chien-hung (TPE) | 4.40 | 731 | |
| 8 | Ahmad Hassan Moussa (QAT) | 4.20 | 673 | |
| 9 | Kim Tae-keun (KOR) | 4.00 | 617 | |

=== Javelin throw ===
| Rank | Athlete | Result | Points | Notes |
|---|---|---|---|---|
| 1 | Ahmad Hassan Moussa (QAT) | 62.83 | 781 | |
| 2 | Qi Haifeng (CHN) | 61.04 | 753 | |
| 3 | Masatoshi Ishizawa (JPN) | 60.02 | 738 | |
| 4 | Vitaliy Smirnov (UZB) | 59.87 | 736 | |
| 5 | Pavel Andreev (UZB) | 59.53 | 731 | |
| 6 | Kim Kun-woo (KOR) | 50.64 | 598 | |
| 7 | Dmitriy Karpov (KAZ) | 49.85 | 586 | |
| 8 | Chen Chien-hung (TPE) | 49.58 | 582 | |
| — | Kim Tae-keun (KOR) | DNS | | |

=== 1500 metres ===
| Rank | Athlete | Time | Points | Notes |
|---|---|---|---|---|
| 1 | Kim Kun-woo (KOR) | 4:16.79 | 834 | |
| 2 | Vitaliy Smirnov (UZB) | 4:33.40 | 722 | |
| 3 | Masatoshi Ishizawa (JPN) | 4:33.91 | 719 | |
| 4 | Qi Haifeng (CHN) | 4:35.17 | 711 | |
| 5 | Ahmad Hassan Moussa (QAT) | 4:35.21 | 711 | |
| 6 | Dmitriy Karpov (KAZ) | 4:45.90 | 644 | |
| 7 | Chen Chien-hung (TPE) | 4:45.95 | 643 | |
| 8 | Pavel Andreev (UZB) | 4:59.74 | 561 | |

=== Summary ===
| Rank | Athlete | 100m | LJ | SP | HJ | 400m | 110mH | DT | PV | JT | 1500m | Total | Notes |
|---|---|---|---|---|---|---|---|---|---|---|---|---|---|
| 1st place, gold medalist(s) | Qi Haifeng (CHN) | 841 | 866 | 670 | 859 | 857 | 906 | 729 | 849 | 753 | 711 | 8041 | |
| 2nd place, silver medalist(s) | Dmitriy Karpov (KAZ) | 814 | 952 | 739 | 887 | 875 | 906 | 802 | 790 | 586 | 644 | 7995 | |
| 3rd place, bronze medalist(s) | Ahmad Hassan Moussa (QAT) | 874 | 821 | 755 | 670 | 888 | 884 | 626 | 673 | 781 | 711 | 7683 | |
| 4 | Vitaliy Smirnov (UZB) | 797 | 778 | 749 | 749 | 815 | 733 | 727 | 731 | 736 | 722 | 7537 | |
| 5 | Masatoshi Ishizawa (JPN) | 814 | 778 | 557 | 696 | 883 | 882 | 594 | 819 | 738 | 719 | 7480 | |
| 6 | Kim Kun-woo (KOR) | 769 | 842 | 605 | 831 | 858 | 762 | 546 | 819 | 598 | 834 | 7464 | |
| 7 | Pavel Andreev (UZB) | 683 | 767 | 798 | 749 | 730 | 783 | 724 | 849 | 731 | 643 | 7457 | |
| 8 | Chen Chien-hung (TPE) | 755 | 804 | 643 | 776 | 798 | 760 | 671 | 731 | 582 | 561 | 7081 | |
| — | Kim Tae-keun (KOR) | 736 | 729 | 641 | 696 | 690 | 802 | 685 | 617 | DNS | | DNF | |
