= German Indoor Combined Events Championships =

- Sport: Indoor combined track and field events
- Founded: 2003
- Country: Germany

The German Indoor Combined Events Championships (German: Deutsche Leichtathletik-Hallenmehrkampfmeisterschaften) is an annual combined track and field events competition which serves as a national indoor championship for Germany.

The competition was established in 2003 by the German Athletics Association and is organised by various regional associations at different locations from year to year. The competition consists of men's heptathlon and women's pentathlon, with three separate age categories: senior, under-20, and under-18.

Prior to the competition's establishment, German national championships in combined events were awarded in West Germany in 1973 to 1975, while those in the East had a more established tradition with a combined events title being awarded within the East German Indoor Athletics Championships from 1971 to its final edition in 1990. The East German events were held on over-sized indoor tracks and the men's event varied, starting as a pentathlon in 1974 until a switch to heptathlon in 1981 and briefly being held as an octathlon from 1987 to 1989. The edition numbering of the East German Athletics Federation's event was inconsistent, with the exclusion of annual championships not held in the regular venue in Senftenberg.

== Editions ==
=== German Championships ===
#	Year	Place	Date	Venue	Ref.
1.	2003	Halle (Saale)	1–2 February 2003	Sporthalle Brandberge	Wertungen
2.	2004	Halle (Saale)	31 January–1 February 2004	Sporthalle Brandberge	Wertungen
3.	2005	Halle (Saale)	29–30 January 2005	Sporthalle Brandberge	Wertungen
4.	2006	Frankfurt-Kalbach	28–29 January 2006	Leichtathletikhalle in F/M.-Kalbach	Wertungen
5.	2007	Frankfurt-Kalbach	27–28 January 2007	Leichtathletikhalle in F/M.-Kalbach	Wertungen
6.	2008	Frankfurt-Kalbach	26–27 January 2008	Leichtathletikhalle in F/M.-Kalbach	Wertungen
7.	2009	Hamburg	31 January–1 February 2009	Leichtathletik-Halle	Wertungen (PDF; 60 kB)
8.	2010	Frankfurt-Kalbach	30–31 January 2010	Leichtathletikhalle in F/M.-Kalbach	Wertungen
9.	2011	Frankfurt-Kalbach	29–30 January 2011	Leichtathletikhalle in F/M.-Kalbach	Ergebnisliste
10.	2012	Dortmund	28–29 January 2012	Helmut-Körnig-Halle	Wertungen
11.	2013	Frankfurt-Kalbach	26–27 January 2013	Leichtathletikhalle in F/M.-Kalbach	Wertungen
12.	2014	Frankfurt-Kalbach	1–2 February 2014	Leichtathletikhalle in F/M.-Kalbach	Ergebnisliste
2015 wurden keine Wettkämpfe ausgetragen
13.	2016	Hamburg-Winterhude	30–31 January 2016	Leichtathletik-Halle	Ergebnisliste
14.	2017	Hamburg-Winterhude	28–29 January 2017	Leichtathletik-Halle	Ergebnisliste
2018 wurde kein Ausrichter gefunden
15.	2019	Halle (Saale)	19 February 2019	Sporthalle Brandberge	Ergebnisliste
16.	2020	Leverkusen	1–2 February 2020	Fritz-Jacobi-Halle	Ergebnisübersicht

=== West German Championships ===
Year	Place	Date	Venue	Ref.
1973	Munich	17–18 March 1973		
1974	Berlin	9–10 March 1974		
1975	Stuttgart	22–23 March 1975		

=== East German Championships ===
Year	Place	Date	Venue	Ref.
1971	Berlin-Hohenschönhausen	13–14 February 1971	Dynamo-Sporthalle	Results
1972	Senftenberg	18–19 February 1972	Sporthalle Aktivist	Results
1973	Senftenberg	3–4 March 1973	Sporthalle Aktivist	Results
1974	Senftenberg	16–17 February 1974	Sporthalle Aktivist	Results
1975	Senftenberg	15–16 February 1975	Sporthalle Aktivist	Results
1976	Berlin-Hohenschönhausen	9–10 March 1976	Dynamo-Sporthalle	Results
1977	Berlin-Hohenschönhausen	26–27 February 1977	Dynamo-Sporthalle	Results
1978	Berlin	18–19 February 1978		Results
1979	Senftenberg	2–3 February 1979	Sporthalle Aktivist	Results
1980	Senftenberg	12–13 January 1980	Sporthalle Aktivist	Results
1981	Senftenberg	23–24 January 1981	Sporthalle Aktivist	Results
1982	Senftenberg	23–24 January 1982	Sporthalle Aktivist	Results
1983	Senftenberg	28–29 January 1983	Sporthalle Aktivist	Results
1984	Senftenberg	6–7 January 1984	Sporthalle Aktivist	Results
1985	Senftenberg	26–27 January 1985	Sporthalle Aktivist	Results
1986	Senftenberg	31 Januarybis 1 February 1986	Sporthalle Aktivist	Results
1987	Senftenberg	31 Januarybis 1 February 1987	Sporthalle Aktivist	Results
1988	Senftenberg	2–3 February 1988	Sporthalle Aktivist	Results
1989	Senftenberg	28–29 January 1989	Sporthalle Aktivist	Results
1990	Senftenberg	27–28 January 1990	Sporthalle Aktivist	Results

== Champions ==
=== German Championships ===
Year	Senior men's heptathlon	Club	Points	Senior women's pentathlon	Club	Points
2003	Stefan Drews	MobilCom Zehnkampf-Welle	5879	Sonja Kesselschläger	SC Neubrandenburg	4531
2004	Stefan Drews	Ahrensburger TSV	5638	Sonja Kesselschläger	SC Neubrandenburg	4505
2005	Norman Müller	Hallesche LAF	5802	Sonja Kesselschläger	SC Neubrandenburg	4471
2006	Stefan Drews	TSV Bayer 04 Leverkusen	5869	Sonja Kesselschläger	SC Neubrandenburg	4586
2007	Jacob Minah	LG Göttingen	5871	Lilli Schwarzkopf	LC Paderborn	4617
2008	Jacob Minah	LG Göttingen	5763	Lilli Schwarzkopf	LC Paderborn	4641
2009	André Niklaus	LG Nike Berlin	5960	Christine Schulz	TSV Bayer 04 Leverkusen	4517
2010	Christopher Hallmann	Ahrensburger TSV	5859	Claudia Rath	LG Eintracht Frankfurt	4274
2011	Lars Albert	LAC Elm	5777	Claudia Rath	LG Eintracht Frankfurt	4339
2012	Steffen Kahlert	TuS Wunstorf	5813	Maren Schwerdtner	Hannover 96	4318
2013	Matthias Prey	SC Rönnau 74	5815	Julia Mächtig	SC Neubrandenburg	4379
2014	Kai Kazmirek	LG Rhein/Wied	6083	Kira Biesenbach	TSV Bayer Leverkusen	4230
2015	Not held due to lack of organiser					
2016	Kai Kazmirek	LG Rhein/Wied	6071	Celina Leffler	SSC Koblenz-Karthause	4347
2017	Mathias Brugger	SSV Ulm 1846	5981	Mareike Arndt	TSV Bayer Leverkusen	4210
2018	Not held due to lack of organiser					
2019	Andreas Bechmann	LG Eintracht Frankfurt	6017	Sophie Hamann	TuS Metzingen	4060
2020	Andreas Bechmann	LG Eintracht Frankfurt	6097	Vanessa Grimm	Königsteiner LV	4263

=== West German Championships ===
Year	Men's heptathlon	Club	Points	Women's pentathlon	Club	Points
1973	Guido Kratschmer	USC Mainz	5560	Ulrike Jacob	LG Erlangen	4358
1974	Kurt-Walter May	Rot-Weiß Koblenz	5551	Christel Voß	TuS 04 Leverkusen	4477
1975	Eckart Müller	TV Wattenscheid	5430	Eva Wilms	ESV Neuaubing	4513

=== East German Championships ===
Year	Men's winner	Club	Points	Women's pentathlon	Club	Points
1971	Not held			Margrit Herbst	SC Magdeburg	5300
1972	Not held			Burglinde Pollak	ASK Vorwärts Potsdam	4490
1973	Not held			Angela Schmalfeld	SC Magdeburg	4449
1974	Rüdiger Demmig	SC Motor Jena	p4123	Sigrun Thon	SC Turbine Erfurt	4469
1975	Edgar Kirst	SC Dynamo Berlin	p4334	Christine Laser	SC Turbine Erfurt	4300
1976	Dietmar Schauerhammer	SC Magdeburg	p4047	Burglinde Pollak	ASK Vorwärts Potsdam	4614
1977	Dietmar Schauerhammer	SC Motor Jena	p4121	Burglinde Pollak	ASK Vorwärts Potsdam	4633
1978	Ronald Wiese	SC Chemie Halle	p3843	Ramona Göhler	SC Einheit Dresden	4355
1979	Dietmar Schauerhammer	SC Motor Jena	p4117	Kristine Nitzsche	SC Cottbus	4473
1980	Dietmar Schauerhammer	SC Motor Jena	p4099	Christine Laser	SC Turbine Erfurt	4622
1981	Rainer Pottel	TSC Berlin	h5656	Ramona Neubert	SC Einheit Dresden	4591
1982	Torsten Voss	SC Traktor Schwerin	h5527	Anke Vater	SC Neubrandenburg	4630
1983	Jörg-Peter Schäperkötter	ASK Vorwärts Potsdam	h5598	Anke Vater	SC Neubrandenburg	4654
1984	Torsten Voss	SC Traktor Schwerin	h6018	Sabine Paetz	SC DHfK Leipzig	4717
1985	Torsten Voss	SC Traktor Schwerin	h6114	Sibylle Thiele	SC Dynamo Berlin	4632
1986	Torsten Voss	SC Traktor Schwerin	h6246	Sabine Paetz	SC DHfK Leipzig	4854
1987	Torsten Voss	SC Traktor Schwerin	o6873	Sibylle Thiele	SC Dynamo Berlin	4488
1988	André Preysing	SC DHfK Leipzig	o6705	Anke Behmer	SC Neubrandenburg	4995
1989	Thomas Halamoda	TSC Berlin	o6398	Anke Schmidt	SC Neubrandenburg	4396
1990	André Preysing	SC DHfK Leipzig	h5900	Birgit Gautzsch	SC Karl-Marx-Stadt	4446

== See also ==
- List of German records in athletics
