= 2002 Asian Athletics Championships – Men's decathlon =

The men's decathlon event at the 2002 Asian Athletics Championships was held in Colombo, Sri Lanka on 11–12 August.

== Results ==
The highest mark recorded in each event is highlighted in yellow

Rank	Athlete	Nationality	100m	LJ	SP	HJ	400m	110m H	DT	PV	JT	1500m	Points	Notes
1st place, gold medalist(s)	Ahmad Hassan Moussa	Qatar	11.02	7.18w	14.12	1.85	48.23	14.54	40.28	4.00	63.44	4:41.57	7670	
2nd place, silver medalist(s)	Pavel Andreyev	Uzbekistan	11.88	7.02w	14.08	2.00	51.21	15.42	41.40	4.40	59.31	4:38.65	7428	
3rd place, bronze medalist(s)	Takuro Hirata	Japan	11.50	6.94	12.04	1.88	49.05	15.84	42.20	4.50	58.98	4:39.31	7344	
4	Masatoshi Ishizawa	Japan	11.43	6.87	10.97	1.85	49.37	14.72	26.40	4.50	56.75	4:47.17	7169	
5	Chen Chien-Hung	Chinese Taipei	11.51	7.16	12.33	2.00	49.86	15.59	42.75	4.40	48.70	5:30.87	7048	
6	Vitaliy Smirnov	Uzbekistan	11.49	6.79	13.85	1.94	49.02	15.57	42.01	4.20	60.40	4:34.88	6710	
7	G.H.R. Priyantha	Sri Lanka	11.72	6.66	9.89	1.76	50.72	15.37	22.91	2.90	41.59	4:41.25	5897	NR
8	Khalifa Isa	Bahrain	11.59	6.47	10.18	1.88	55.09	16.25	28.05	3.70	44.04	5:11.19	5876	PB
9	O.B.A.R. Fonseka	Sri Lanka	11.84	6.17w	8.55	1.73	51.02	16.23	24.23	3.30	41.83	4:30.54	5743	PB
10	Priya Ranga	Sri Lanka	11.77	6.56w	8.28	1.73	50.82	17.65	28.68	3.10	38.80	4:29.66	5687	PB
	Qi Haifeng	China	11.24	7.52	13.14	1.94	48.76	14.93	47.83	4.60	57.80	DNS	DNF	
	Fidel Gallenero	Philippines	11.42	6.61	10.39	1.76	52.38	DNS	–	–	–	–	DNF	
	Tobias Ahmad	Malaysia	DNS	–	–	–	–	–	–	–	–	–	DNS	
