= 2007 Asian Athletics Championships – Men's decathlon =

The men's decathlon event at the 2007 Asian Athletics Championships was held in Amman, Jordan on July 27–28.

== Results ==
The highest mark recorded in each event is highlighted in yellow

Rank	Athlete	Nationality	100m	LJ	SP	HJ	400m	110m H	DT	PV	JT	1500m	Points	Notes
1st place, gold medalist(s)	Ahmad Hassan Moussa	Qatar	10.85	7.16	14.40	1.83	50.14	14.78	41.01	4.20	66.40	4:44.95	7678	
2nd place, silver medalist(s)	Hadi Sepehrzad	Iran	10.84	7.05	15.85	1.86	50.87	14.69	49.17	4.30	54.84	5:02.58	7667	
3rd place, bronze medalist(s)	Pavel Andreev	Uzbekistan	11.61	6.88	14.64	2.01	52.76	15.51	41.18	5.00	52.31	4:39.23	7484	
4	Vinod Pulimootil Joseph	India	10.79	7.40	13.05	1.86	49.89	14.82	35.77	4.70	45.11	4:41.96	7441	
5	Kim Kun-Woo	South Korea	11.28	7.27	12.34	1.89	49.34	15.15	35.42	4.40	48.73	4:22.30	7354	
6	Jora Singh	India	11.29	6.47	12.85	1.83	51.58	15.53	43.36	4.70	54.96	5:14.19	7024	
	Pavel Dubitskiy	Kazakhstan	11.29	7.11	12.44	2.04	52.76	DNS	–	–	–	–	DNF	
	Vitaliy Smirnov	Uzbekistan	DNS	–	–	–	–	–	–	–	–	–	DNS	
	Mohammed Al-Qaree	Saudi Arabia	DNS	–	–	–	–	–	–	–	–	–	DNS	
