= 2005 Asian Athletics Championships – Men's decathlon =

The men's decathlon event at the 2005 Asian Athletics Championships was held in Incheon, South Korea on September 3–4.

== Results ==
The highest mark recorded in each event is highlighted in yellow

Rank	Athlete	Nationality	100m	LJ	SP	HJ	400m	110m H	DT	PV	JT	1500m	Points	Notes
1st place, gold medalist(s)	Pavel Andreev	Uzbekistan	11.71	6.99	14.87	2.05	51.83	15.78	46.04	4.80	60.80	4:34.53	7744	SB
2nd place, silver medalist(s)	Kim Kun-Woo	South Korea	11.31	7.44	13.14	1.99	48.58	15.05	36.28	4.40	49.14	4:08.63	7694	
3rd place, bronze medalist(s)	Hiromasa Tanaka	Japan	11.04	7.01	12.14	1.84	50.86	15.61	38.39	4.80	60.80	4:49.10	7351	
4	Meng Hsiang-Tsu	Chinese Taipei	11.33	7.17	11.94	2.05	51.75	15.89	38.34	4.50	58.25	5:01.39	7232	
5	Kulwinder Singh	India	11.08	6.64	13.46	1.81	49.64	15.82	39.86	4.10	58.41	4:45.04	7157	
6	Jora Singh	India	11.45	6.44	13.57	1.78	50.40	15.80	46.34	4.00	56.01	4:47.71	7032	
7	Hadi Sepehrzad	Iran	11.18	6.30	14.81	1.84	50.90	15.54	45.89	3.60	50.46	5:05.45	6889	SB
8	Boonkete Chalon	Thailand	11.32	6.72	11.31	1.84	49.64	16.05	35.26	4.00	48.53	4:46.18	6718	
9	Bui Van Ha	Vietnam	11.30	6.49	10.47	1.84	51.65	15.67	31.86	4.00	48.83	4:43.23	6524	
10	Ravi Ratheeshan	Sri Lanka	11.38	7.05	9.25	1.78	51.31	16.24	31.26	3.30	43.87	4:52.05	6140	
	Pavel Dubitskiy	Kazakhstan	11.45	7.23	12.25	2.11	52.91	15.45	39.92	4.50	50.05	DNS	DNF	
	Hsiao Szu-Pin	Chinese Taipei	11.16	6.64	13.32	NM	DNS	–	–	–	–	–	DNF	
	Vu Van Huyen	Vietnam	11.21	6.85	10.74	DNS	–	–	–	–	–	–	DNF	
