= 2001 European Athletics U23 Championships – Men's decathlon =

The men's decathlon event at the 2001 European Athletics U23 Championships was held in Amsterdam, Netherlands, at Olympisch Stadion on 12 and 13 July.

== Medalists ==
Gold	André Niklaus; Germany
Silver	Jaakko Ojaniemi; Finland
Bronze	William Frullani; Italy

== Results ==
=== Final ===
12-13 July

The highest mark recorded in each event is highlighted in yellow

Rank	Name	Nationality	100m	LJ	SP	HJ	400m	110m H	DT	PV	JT	1500m	Points	Notes
1st place, gold medalist(s)	André Niklaus	Germany	11.16 (w: 0.3 m/s)	7.33 (w: -0.2 m/s)	13.84	1.92	48.90	14.57 (w: -1.2 m/s)	41.82	5.20	53.91	4:23.86	8042	
2nd place, silver medalist(s)	Jaakko Ojaniemi	Finland	10.69 (w: 0.3 m/s)	7.54 (w: 0.0 m/s)	15.39	1.95	49.59	14.97 (w: -0.9 m/s)	37.01	4.50	62.72	4:48.28	7907	
3rd place, bronze medalist(s)	William Frullani	Italy	10.65 (w: 0.3 m/s)	7.58 (w: 1.4 m/s)	13.80	2.13	48.78	14.68 (w: -1.2 m/s)	41.61	4.40	43.89	4:45.42	7871	
4	Romain Barras	France	11.17 (w: 0.3 m/s)	6.95 (w: 0.0 m/s)	14.31	1.95	48.97	14.31 (w: -1.2 m/s)	36.95	4.70	59.30	4:30.14	7821	
5	Thomas Pöge	Germany	11.19 (w: 1.7 m/s)	7.07 (w: -1.1 m/s)	14.99	1.95	51.18	14.76 (w: -1.2 m/s)	39.87	4.60	58.89	4:38.54	7699	
6	David Gómez	Spain	11.22 (w: 1.7 m/s)	7.12 (w: -0.1 m/s)	13.27	1.95	48.89	14.73 (w: -1.2 m/s)	36.53	4.50	57.06	4:28.14	7649	
7	Sébastien Maillard	France	11.03 (w: 0.3 m/s)	7.01 (w: 0.7 m/s)	12.53	2.01	49.42	14.95 (w: -0.9 m/s)	36.64	4.80	44.64	4:23.82	7562	
8	Eugène Martineau	Netherlands	11.23 (w: 1.7 m/s)	6.71 (w: 0.6 m/s)	12.51	1.95	49.47	15.45 (w: -0.9 m/s)	37.76	4.70	61.60	4:33.59	7507	
9	Virgil Spier	Netherlands	10.71 (w: 0.3 m/s)	7.26	13.03	1.95	47.80	14.35 (w: -1.2 m/s)	36.32	4.00	41.17	4:32.98	7469	
10	Andre Röttger	Germany	11.27	7.08	13.40	1.83	50.46	15.36	39.18	4.20	64.57	4:37.99	7401	
11	Markus Walser	Austria	10.83	6.79	13.46	1.83	49.48	15.11	36.76	4.30	57.12	4:46.55	7322	
12	Roland Schwarzl	Austria	11.34 (w: 1.7 m/s)	7.15 (w: 0.4 m/s)	14.10	1.80	50.86	15.28 (w: -1.2 m/s)	40.22	4.50	50.05	4:39.84	7287	
13	Rudy Bourguignon	France	11.08	6.84	12.33	1.83	51.07	15.80	39.74	4.80	50.25	4:46.57	7159	
	Knut Harald Sommerfeldt	Norway	11.42	7.01	13.38	1.83	52.95	15.25	NM	4.60	60.93		DNF	
	Boštjan Vinkler	Slovenia	11.35	6.82	12.62	1.83	50.47	15.11	38.70				DNF	
	Michael Schnallinger	Austria	11.39	6.38	12.74	1.98	52.13						DNF	

== Participation ==
According to an unofficial count, 16 athletes from 9 countries participated in the event.

- Austria (3)
- Finland (1)
- France (3)
- Germany (3)
- Italy (1)
- Netherlands (2)
- Norway (1)
- Slovenia (1)
- Spain (1)
