= 2000 World Junior Championships in Athletics – Men's decathlon =

The men's decathlon event at the 2000 World Junior Championships in Athletics was held in Santiago, Chile, at Estadio Nacional Julio Martínez Prádanos on 18 and 19 October. Senior implements (106.7 cm (3'6) hurdles, 7257g shot, 2 kg discus) were used.

== Medalists ==
Gold	Dennis Leyckes; Germany
Silver	David Gómez; Spain
Bronze	André Niklaus; Germany

== Results ==
=== Final ===
18/19 October

The highest mark recorded in each event is highlighted in yellow

Rank	Name	Nationality	100m	LJ	SP	HJ	400m	110m H	DT	PV	JT	1500m	Points	Notes
1st place, gold medalist(s)	Dennis Leyckes	Germany	10.98 (w: 1.6 m/s)	7.22	13.46	1.95	47.59	14.61 (w: -0.1 m/s)	39.52	4.80	54.76	4:33.10	7897	
2nd place, silver medalist(s)	David Gómez	Spain	11.03 (w: -0.4 m/s)	7.12	13.06	1.92	47.81	14.52 (w: -0.1 m/s)	39.17	4.30	58.64	4:24.55	7772	
3rd place, bronze medalist(s)	André Niklaus	Germany	11.09 (w: 0.6 m/s)	6.94	13.25	1.92	48.55	14.61 (w: -0.1 m/s)	39.32	4.90	49.51	4:26.58	7712	
4	Dmitriy Karpov	Kazakhstan	11.12 (w: 0.6 m/s)	7.21	13.74	1.92	48.53	14.68 (w: -0.1 m/s)	41.56	4.30	42.11	4:56.28	7366	
5	Indrek Turi	Estonia	11.14 (w: 1.6 m/s)	6.30	12.65	1.92	50.63	14.86 (w: -0.1 m/s)	35.89	4.60	55.95	4:43.16	7222	
6	Pavel Havlícek	Czech Republic	11.60 (w: 1.6 m/s)	6.86	12.71	1.98	51.50	15.79 (w: 0.2 m/s)	39.57	4.70	56.15	5:06.21	7131	
7	Pavel Dubitskiy	Kazakhstan	11.22 (w: -0.4 m/s)	7.09	12.18	2.07	51.94	15.50 (w: -0.2 m/s)	33.36	4.00	52.33	4:56.77	6998	
8	Niki Joorits	Estonia	11.12 (w: -0.4 m/s)	7.12	11.79	1.86	49.70	15.74 (w: 0.2 m/s)	36.09	4.10	48.43	4:45.82	6979	
9	Iván da Silva	Brazil	11.43 (w: 0.6 m/s)	6.70	12.12	1.92	49.89	15.85 (w: 0.2 m/s)	35.22	3.90	57.36	4:39.00	6968	
10	Milan Kohout	Czech Republic	11.40 (w: -0.4 m/s)	6.48	10.45	1.98	51.06	15.69 (w: -0.2 m/s)	30.66	4.60	47.50	4:21.26	6921	
11	Manuel Liechti	Switzerland	11.03 (w: 1.6 m/s)	6.56	11.10	1.92	51.13	15.33 (w: -0.2 m/s)	32.71	4.00	50.76	4:42.54	6820	
12	Cristian Lyon	Chile	11.20 (w: -0.4 m/s)	7.13	12.04	1.92	50.97	15.15 (w: -0.2 m/s)	28.57	4.40	36.72	4:50.49	6781	
13	Ahmed Moussa	Qatar	11.19 (w: 0.6 m/s)	6.88	12.74	1.71	51.28	16.04 (w: -0.1 m/s)	36.14	4.00	55.38	4:54.89	6755	
14	Leonid Andreyev	Uzbekistan	11.64 (w: 0.6 m/s)	6.72	12.31	1.89	52.20	16.19 (w: 0.2 m/s)	37.65	4.20	53.24	5:10.86	6654	
15	Wilfried Gouacide	France	10.71 (w: 1.6 m/s)	7.38	11.83	1.74	49.55	16.09 (w: -0.2 m/s)	32.21	4.00	42.97	5:17.87	6633	
16	Chen Ying-Chi	Chinese Taipei	11.09 (w: 0.6 m/s)	7.03	13.24	1.74	51.25	16.17 (w: 0.2 m/s)	32.93	3.50	48.96	4:56.76	6549	
	Sébastien Maillard	France	11.04 (w: -0.4 m/s)	7.03	12.27	2.01	49.31	15.16 (w: -0.1 m/s)	36.66	4.50	36.33	DNS	DNF	
	Yosbel Espinosa	Cuba	11.06 (w: -0.4 m/s)	6.74	12.29	1.86	49.39	15.39 (w: 0.2 m/s)	41.66	DNS	52.42	DNS	DNF	
	Ludrick Berrenstein	Netherlands	11.02 (w: 0.6 m/s)	7.05	12.32	1.89	DNS	DNS	DNS	DNS	DNS	DNS	DNF	
	Virgil Spier	Netherlands	10.54 (w: 1.6 m/s)	5.87	12.46	DNS	DNS	DNS	DNS	DNS	DNS	DNS	DNF	

== Participation ==
According to an unofficial count, 20 athletes from 14 countries participated in the event.

- Brazil (1)
- Chile (1)
- Chinese Taipei (1)
- Cuba (1)
- Czech Republic (2)
- Estonia (2)
- France (2)
- Germany (2)
- Kazakhstan (2)
- Netherlands (2)
- Qatar (1)
- Spain (1)
- Switzerland (1)
- Uzbekistan (1)
