= 1998 World Junior Championships in Athletics – Men's decathlon =

The men's decathlon event at the 1998 World Junior Championships in Athletics was held in Annecy, France, at Parc des Sports on 29 and 30 July. Senior implements (106.7 cm (3'6) hurdles, 7257g shot, 2 kg discus) were used.

== Medalists ==
Gold	Aki Heikkinen; Finland
Silver	Thomas Pöge; Germany
Bronze	Jaakko Ojaniemi; Finland

== Results ==
=== Final ===
29/30 July

The highest mark recorded in each event is highlighted in yellow

Rank	Name	Nationality	100m	LJ	SP	HJ	400m	110m H	DT	PV	JT	1500m	Points	Notes
1st place, gold medalist(s)	Aki Heikkinen	Finland	11.43 (w: -0.5 m/s)	6.80	12.83	1.89	50.70	15.31 (w: -1.2 m/s)	38.72	4.60	65.77	4:32.01	7476	
2nd place, silver medalist(s)	Thomas Pöge	Germany	11.43 (w: -0.3 m/s)	6.93	13.12	1.98	51.51	14.98 (w: -0.1 m/s)	35.03	4.60	57.92	4:45.09	7332	
3rd place, bronze medalist(s)	Jaakko Ojaniemi	Finland	11.11 (w: -1.3 m/s)	7.25	12.86	1.95	50.56	15.59 (w: -1.2 m/s)	36.42	4.20	54.62	4:48.38	7246	
4	Stefan Drews	Germany	11.23 (w: -0.5 m/s)	7.13	10.78	1.86	49.53	14.55 (w: -1.2 m/s)	33.57	4.60	46.07	4:33.38	7187	
5	Edwin van Calker	Netherlands	10.84 (w: -0.5 m/s)	7.40	11.90	1.80	48.59	15.14 (w: -0.1 m/s)	34.95	4.00	48.66	4:54.42	7089	
6	Edson Bindilatti	Brazil	11.24 (w: -1.3 m/s)	7.14	10.89	1.98	48.28	14.92 (w: -1.2 m/s)	33.72	4.20	41.76	4:41.85	7082	
7	Marcin Kondratowicz	Poland	11.48 (w: -0.3 m/s)	7.04	12.83	1.89	51.46	15.80 (w: -1.2 m/s)	37.86	4.30	52.64	4:43.75	7054	
8	Denis Zavyalov	Russia	11.75 (w: -0.3 m/s)	6.76	11.69	1.89	50.07	15.49 (w: -0.6 m/s)	37.24	4.50	44.86	4:21.68	7035	
9	Rudy Bourguignon	France	11.50 (w: -0.3 m/s)	6.94	11.92	1.83	52.57	16.63 (w: -1.2 m/s)	38.37	4.90	53.98	4:45.75	6975	
10	Michael Schnallinger	Austria	11.48 (w: -1.3 m/s)	6.68	11.90	2.01	51.36	15.43 (w: -0.1 m/s)	38.11	4.10	57.63	5:05.16	6963	
11	Bostjan Vinkler	Slovenia	11.31 (w: -0.5 m/s)	7.03	12.63	1.86	50.07	15.07 (w: -0.6 m/s)	36.20	4.10	48.24	5:06.39	6909	
12	Ahmed Moussa	Qatar	11.19 (w: -1.3 m/s)	6.79	11.64	1.65	49.55	15.48 (w: -0.6 m/s)	40.55	3.50	62.15	4:45.67	6872	
13	Claston Bernard	Jamaica	11.15 (w: -0.5 m/s)	6.23	13.64	2.01	50.53	15.77 (w: -0.6 m/s)	41.52	3.40	48.14	5:06.49	6769	
14	Michael Cvelbar	United States	11.60 (w: -0.5 m/s)	6.47	10.59	1.95	50.57	15.45 (w: -0.6 m/s)	35.80	4.30	50.54	4:54.12	6760	
15	Marcis Rullis	Latvia	11.19 (w: -0.5 m/s)	6.33	12.56	1.80	51.87	15.41 (w: -0.1 m/s)	38.98	4.20	44.45	4:57.82	6672	
16	Trevor Phillips	Canada	11.51 (w: -0.3 m/s)	6.87	11.87	1.95	53.38	16.15 (w: -0.1 m/s)	33.25	3.80	52.18	5:29.02	6387	
17	Pierre Charles Peuf	France	11.51 (w: -1.3 m/s)	6.37	11.58	1.80	52.05	DQ	36.16	4.90	41.15	DNS	5275	
	Roland Schwarzl	Austria	11.70 (w: -1.3 m/s)	6.82	12.54	1.89	51.37	15.63 (w: -0.1 m/s)	36.28	4.30	DNS	DNS	DNF	
	Levard Missick	Turks and Caicos Islands	11.33 (w: -0.5 m/s)	6.78	10.00	1.95	50.82	17.38 (w: -1.2 m/s)	29.45	DNF	46.62	DNS	DNF	
	Oleg Klimovets	Belarus	11.54 (w: -0.3 m/s)	6.44	12.13	1.89	52.27	15.17 (w: -0.6 m/s)	36.66	DNF	DNS	DNS	DNF	
	Kristjan Rahnu	Estonia	11.38 (w: -0.3 m/s)	6.97	13.78	1.83	50.96	17.01 (w: -1.2 m/s)	DNS	DNS	DNS	DNS	DNF	
	Daniel Ryland	United States	10.94 (w: -1.3 m/s)	6.63	11.64	1.77	48.22	20.08 (w: -0.6 m/s)	DNS	DNS	DNS	DNS	DNF	

== Participation ==
According to an unofficial count, 22 athletes from 17 countries participated in the event.

- Austria (2)
- Belarus (1)
- Brazil (1)
- Canada (1)
- Estonia (1)
- Finland (2)
- France (2)
- Germany (2)
- Jamaica (1)
- Latvia (1)
- Netherlands (1)
- Poland (1)
- Qatar (1)
- Russia (1)
- Slovenia (1)
- Turks and Caicos Islands (1)
- United States (2)
