= 2000 Asian Athletics Championships – Men's decathlon =

The men's decathlon event at the 2000 Asian Athletics Championships was held in Jakarta, Indonesia on 30–31 August.

== Results ==
The highest mark recorded in each event is highlighted in yellow

Rank	Athlete	Nationality	100m	LJ	SP	HJ	400m	110m H	DT	PV	JT	1500m	Points	Notes
1st place, gold medalist(s)	Hitoshi Maruono	Japan	11.80	7.03	13.03	1.91	52.15	15.25	40.08	4.70	64.98	4:56.33	7321	
2nd place, silver medalist(s)	Kim Kun-Woo	South Korea	11.48	7.06	11.24	1.85	48.91	16.26	31.07	4.50	48.18	4:16.02	7031	
3rd place, bronze medalist(s)	Kim Sang-Ryong	North Korea	11.47	6.79	12.43	1.97	49.89	16.20	33.39	4.60	49.31	4:51.56	6970	
4	Takeshi Yoneshima	Japan	11.39	7.19	11.65	1.91	52.36	15.39	33.16	4.50	50.24	4:48.63	6961	
5	Song Shulin	China	12.04	6.64	13.37	1.85	54.21	15.79	38.79	4.60	54.76	5:02.80	6753	
6	Fidel Gallenero	Philippines	11.07	6.82	11.30	1.85	50.37	15.83	33.55	3.90	50.87	5:02.57	6671	
	Chen Chien-Huang	Chinese Taipei	11.18	7.07	12.38	DNS	–	–	–	–	–	–	DNF	
	Ahmad Hassan Moussa	Qatar	11.23	6.62	DNS	–	–	–	–	–	–	–	DNF	
