= 2003 World Championships in Athletics – Men's decathlon =

These are the official results of the men's decathlon competition at the 2003 World Championships in Athletics in Paris, France. With 20 participating athletes, including eight non-finishers, the competition is notable for having the lowest number of competitors in the World Championships history. The competition started on Monday 26 August 2003 and ended on Tuesday 27 August 2003.

== Medalists ==
Gold	Tom Pappas; United States (USA)
Silver	Roman Šebrle; Czech Republic (CZE)
Bronze	Dmitriy Karpov; Kazakhstan (KAZ)

== Schedule ==
Monday, 26 August
1. 100 m
2. Long jump
3. Shot put
4. High jump
5. 400 m

Tuesday, 27 August
6. 110 m hurdles
7. Discus throw
8. Pole vault
9. Javelin throw
10. 1,500 m

== Records ==
World record	Roman Šebrle (CZE)	9026	27 May 2001	Götzis, Austria
Event record	Tomáš Dvořák (CZE)	8902	7 August 2001	Edmonton, Canada

== Results ==
The highest mark recorded in each event is highlighted in yellow. These marks were split between seven competitors with the gold medallist claiming the mark for the shot put.

Rank	Athlete	Decathlon										Points
Rank	Athlete	1	2	3	4	5	6	7	8	9	10	Points
1st place, gold medalist(s)	Tom Pappas (USA)	10.80	7.62	16.11	2.09	47.58	13.99	46.94	5.10	65.90	4:44.31	8750
2nd place, silver medalist(s)	Roman Šebrle (CZE)	11.00	7.64	15.47	2.06	47.90	14.25	47.47	4.80	69.79	4:34.45	8634
3rd place, bronze medalist(s)	Dmitriy Karpov (KAZ)	10.72	7.75	15.51	2.12	47.33	13.95	47.38	4.40	47.53	4:37.70	8374
4	Tomáš Dvořák (CZE)	11.03	7.28	15.95	1.94	50.04	14.15	45.47	4.50	67.10	4:27.63	8242
5	Laurent Hernu (FRA)	11.20	7.22	13.99	2.03	48.95	14.15	46.13	4.90	59.63	4:28.38	8218
6	Lev Lobodin (RUS)	10.99	7.08	15.43	1.97	49.54	14.36	48.36	5.00	56.50	4:34.63	8198
7	Qi Haifeng (CHN)	11.30	7.39	12.85	2.00	48.73	14.40	46.72	4.80	59.98	4:25.40	8126
8	André Niklaus (GER)	11.19	7.21	13.87	1.97	49.95	14.50	42.68	5.10	57.55	4:28.84	8020
9	Claston Bernard (JAM)	10.91	7.22	15.39	2.03	49.31	14.76	43.47	4.30	59.47	4:34.49	8000
10	Vitaliy Smirnov (UZB)	11.10	6.98	13.89	1.97	48.98	14.98	42.70	4.50	62.69	4:24.68	7897
11	Chiel Warners (NED)	10.95	7.55	14.13	1.91	48.94	14.72	41.49	4.50	54.87	4:51.35	7753
12	Paul Terek (USA)	10.99	7.14	15.30	2.03	48.75	DSQ	45.72	5.30	61.14	4:30.77	7503
—	Aleksandr Pogorelov (RUS)	11.16	7.22	15.21	2.06	50.49	14.28	44.59	4.90	DNS	—	DNF
—	Paolo Casarsa (ITA)	11.46	6.69	14.57	1.94	51.63	14.54	36.21	NM	DNS	—	DNF
—	Attila Zsivoczky (HUN)	11.32	6.76	14.35	2.09	49.79	DNS	—	—	—	—	DNF
—	Bryan Clay (USA)	10.50	7.70	15.05	1.97	DNF	—	—	—	—	—	DNF
—	Kristjan Rahnu (EST)	10.85	7.18	15.55	1.97	DSQ	—	—	—	—	—	DNF
—	Hamdi Dhouibi (TUN)	10.83	6.96	13.13	DNS	—	—	—	—	—	—	DNF
—	Erki Nool (EST)	11.09	6.78	14.14	DNS	—	—	—	—	—	—	DNF
—	Jón Arnar Magnússon (ISL)	11.11	6.15	15.29	DNS	—	—	—	—	—	—	DNF

== See also ==
- 2002 European Athletics Championships – Men's decathlon
- 2003 Decathlon Year Ranking
- 2003 Hypo-Meeting
- Athletics at the 2003 Pan American Games – Men's decathlon
- Athletics at the 2003 Summer Universiade – Men's decathlon
- Athletics at the 2004 Summer Olympics – Men's decathlon
