= 2003 Asian Athletics Championships – Men's decathlon =

The men's decathlon event at the 2003 Asian Athletics Championships was held in Manila, Philippines on September 22–23.

== Results ==
The highest mark recorded in each event is highlighted in yellow.

Rank	Athlete	Nationality	100m	LJ	SP	HJ	400m	110m H	DT	PV	JT	1500m	Points	Notes
1st place, gold medalist(s)	Vitaliy Smirnov	Uzbekistan	10.91	7.18	13.80	2.03	48.82	14.69	42.72	4.60	62.23	4:37.18	8021	PB
2nd place, silver medalist(s)	Pavel Dubitskiy	Kazakhstan	11.07	7.25	12.44	2.15	51.51	15.36 (w)	37.97	4.70	56.27	4:47.96	7604	
3rd place, bronze medalist(s)	Pavel Andreev	Uzbekistan	11.51	6.79	14.12	2.03	52.47	15.20	43.24	4.70	57.61	4:48.92	7487	SB
4	Masatoshi Ishizawa	Japan	11.07	7.22	11.73	1.91	48.68	14.60 (w)	34.28	4.20	56.80	4:40.40	7389	
5	Takuro Hirata	Japan	11.13	7.06	13.19	1.88	49.24	15.28	38.52	4.70	58.21	5:19.75	7317	
6	Kulwinder Singh	India	10.92	6.86	13.18	1.82	50.10	15.47 (w)	38.24	4.40	56.68	4:44.60	7285	SB
7	Mohd Malik Ahmad Tobias	Malaysia	11.22	7.46	14.51	1.94	53.59	14.63	38.80	4.40	50.98	6:02.47	7026	
8	Hsiao Szu-Pin	Chinese Taipei	10.95	7.11	13.23	2.00	50.84	15.66	36.56	4.00	49.58	5:22.06	6977	
9	Pulimootil Joseph Vinod	India	11.08	7.18	12.02	1.88	49.87	15.56	30.78	3.90	45.93	4:48.77	6833	SB
10	Roberto Fresnido	Philippines											6440	PB
11	Alonzo Jardin	Philippines											6353	PB
12	Fidel Gallenero	Philippines											6147	
13	Viravut Jampathong	Thailand											6017	SB
	Ali Feizi	Iran											DNF	
	Kim Kun-Woo	South Korea											DNF	
	Meshari Zaki Al-Mubarak	Kuwait											DNF	
	Ali Al-Khabaz	Kuwait											DNF	
	Boonkete Chalon	Thailand											DNF	
	Pham Viet Anh	Vietnam											DNF	
	Bui Van Ha	Vietnam											DNF	
