= 2003 European Athletics U23 Championships – Men's decathlon =

The men's decathlon event at the 2003 European Athletics U23 Championships was held in Bydgoszcz, Poland, at Zawisza Stadion on 17 and 18 July.

== Medalists ==
Gold	André Niklaus; Germany
Silver	Indrek Turi; Estonia
Bronze	Atis Vaisjūns; Latvia

== Results ==
=== Final ===
17-18 July

The highest mark recorded in each event is highlighted in yellow

Rank	Name	Nationality	100m	LJ	SP	HJ	400m	110m H	DT	PV	JT	1500m	Points	Notes
1st place, gold medalist(s)	André Niklaus	Germany	11.24 (w: 0.8 m/s)	7.14 (w: 0.8 m/s)	13.28	2.03	50.18	14.54 (w: 1.6 m/s)	43.06	5.00	59.13	4:30.90	7983	
2nd place, silver medalist(s)	Indrek Turi	Estonia	11.29 (w: 0.3 m/s)	6.80 (w: 0.0 m/s)	13.87	2.06	50.54	14.44 (w: 1.6 m/s)	39.69	5.00	60.59	4:37.14	7864	
3rd place, bronze medalist(s)	Atis Vaisjūns	Latvia	11.29 (w: 1.0 m/s)	7.08 (w: 0.3 m/s)	13.46	2.03	49.87	15.12 (w: 1.2 m/s)	40.57	4.60	58.48	4:38.72	7681	
4	Lars Albert	Germany	11.24 (w: 0.8 m/s)	7.07 (w: 0.9 m/s)	15.49	1.94	51.91	15.21 (w: -2.1 m/s)	41.71	4.50	59.73	4:41.04	7627	
5	Christopher Hallmann	Germany	10.79 (w: 0.3 m/s)	7.22 (w: -0.3 m/s)	11.48	1.91	47.76	14.94 (w: -2.1 m/s)	36.04	4.50	55.90	4:30.10	7615	
6	David Gómez	Spain	11.23 (w: 1.0 m/s)	7.07 (w: -0.6 m/s)	13.72	1.88	49.90	14.40 (w: 1.6 m/s)	40.18	4.20	58.59	4:35.08	7560	
7	Mihail Papaioannou	Greece	10.92 (w: 1.0 m/s)	7.12 (w: 0.1 m/s)	12.86	1.97	49.82	15.05 (w: -2.1 m/s)	38.27	4.30	49.96	4:37.48	7436	
8	Aleksey Drozdov	Russia	11.30 (w: 0.8 m/s)	6.92 (w: -0.5 m/s)	14.47	1.97	51.74	15.73 (w: 1.2 m/s)	44.01	4.30	49.26	4:36.90	7348	
9	Hristos Halitsios	Greece	10.92 (w: 1.0 m/s)	7.42 (w: -0.1 m/s)	13.33	2.00	51.17	14.34 (w: 1.6 m/s)	40.34	4.60	39.93	5:17.81	7339	
10	Mihai Timofte	Romania	11.23 (w: 0.8 m/s)	7.06 (w: -0.3 m/s)	13.25	2.00	50.67	15.18 (w: -2.1 m/s)	39.01	4.10	50.40	4:35.33	7329	
11	Mikk Joorits	Estonia	10.88 (w: 0.3 m/s)	6.96 (w: -0.1 m/s)	11.98	1.82	47.61	15.70 (w: 1.2 m/s)	40.58	4.10	51.23	4:35.84	7271	
12	Damjan Sitar	Slovenia	11.12 (w: 0.8 m/s)	6.94 (w: -0.2 m/s)	10.44	2.15	49.40	15.01 (w: 1.6 m/s)	36.67	4.30	35.08	4:36.26	7153	
13	Matteo Kranner	Italy	11.13 (w: 0.3 m/s)	6.56 (w: 0.0 m/s)	12.02	1.91	50.95	14.82 (w: -2.1 m/s)	44.11	4.40	48.37	4:56.76	7140	
14	Álvaro Contreras	Spain	11.32 (w: 0.3 m/s)	6.94 (w: -1.1 m/s)	12.16	1.94	49.36	15.47 (w: 1.2 m/s)	32.91	4.30	44.94	4:27.06	7095	
15	Aliaksandr Parkhomenka	Belarus	11.35 (w: 0.8 m/s)	NM	14.89	2.03	50.97	15.35 (w: 1.2 m/s)	43.22	4.70	66.05	4:39.61	7037	
16	Mikko Halvari	Finland	11.08 (w: 1.0 m/s)	7.03 (w: 0.2 m/s)	13.16	1.91	51.46	14.92 (w: 1.2 m/s)	47.13	NM	52.84		6114	
	Hans Olav Uldal	Norway	11.52 (w: 0.3 m/s)	6.95 (w: -0.1 m/s)	13.56	1.85	51.16	15.89 (w: 1.2 m/s)	45.45	4.20			DNF	
	Pavel Havlíček	Czech Republic	11.20 (w: 1.0 m/s)	7.29 (w: 0.5 m/s)	13.62	2.00	49.11	15.14 (w: -2.1 m/s)	NM				DNF	
	Tatu Pussila	Finland	11.37 (w: 0.3 m/s)	7.01 (w: 0.0 m/s)	13.29	1.82	52.99	14.98 (w: 1.6 m/s)	NM				DNF	

== Participation ==
According to an unofficial count, 19 athletes from 13 countries participated in the event.

- Belarus (1)
- Czech Republic (1)
- Estonia (2)
- Finland (2)
- Germany (3)
- Greece (2)
- Italy (1)
- Latvia (1)
- Norway (1)
- Romania (1)
- Russia (1)
- Slovenia (1)
- Spain (2)
