= Thomas Poge =

Thomas Poge may refer to:

- Thomas Pöge, bobsledder
- Thomas Poge (MP) for Nottingham (UK Parliament constituency)
