= Athletics at the 2004 Summer Olympics – Men's decathlon =

Men's decathlon at the Games of the XXVIII Olympiad
- Olympic Athletics
- Venue: Olympic Stadium
- Date: 23–24 August
- Competitors: 39 from 26 nations
- Winning points: 8893 OR

Medalists
1st place, gold medalist(s)		Roman Šebrle	Czech Republic
2nd place, silver medalist(s)		Bryan Clay	United States
3rd place, bronze medalist(s)		Dmitriy Karpov	Kazakhstan

The men's decathlon competition at the 2004 Summer Olympics in Athens was held at the Olympic Stadium on 23–24 August.

== Competition format ==
The decathlon consists of ten track and field events, with a points system that awards higher scores for better results in each of the ten components. The athletes all compete in one competition with no elimination rounds.

At the end of competition, if two athletes are tied, the athlete who has received more points in the greater number of events is the winner.

== Schedule ==
All times are Greece Standard Time (UTC+2)

Date	Time	Round
Monday, 23 August 2004	09:15; 10:15; 13:15; 18:30; 19:20	100 metres Long jump Shot put High jump 400 metres
Tuesday, 24 August 2004	09:00; 10:05; 13:45; 19:30; 21:00	110 metres hurdles Discus throw Pole vault Javelin throw 1500 metres

== Records ==
Prior to the competition, the existing World and Olympic records were as follows:

World record	Roman Šebrle (CZE)	9026	Götzis, Austria	26–27 May 2001
Olympic record	Daley Thompson (GBR)	8847	Los Angeles, United States	8–9 August 1984

Video on YouTube Official Video Highlights

=== Record set during this event ===
Date	Event	Name	Nationality	Result	Record
24 August	Final	Roman Šebrle	Czech Republic	8893	OR

== Overall results ==
The final results of the event are in the following table.

Key

The highest mark recorded in each event is highlighted in yellow. These marks were split between six competitors with the gold medallist claiming two of them.

Rank	Athlete	Country	Score	100m	LJ	SP	HJ	400m	110mH	DT	PV	JT	1500m
1st place, gold medalist(s)	Roman Šebrle	Czech Republic	8893 (OR)	894; 10.85s	1020; 7.84m	873; 16.36m	915; 2.12s	892; 48.36s	968; 14.05s	844; 48.72m	910; 5.00m	897; 70.52m	680; 4:40.01s
2nd place, silver medalist(s)	Bryan Clay	United States	8820 (PB)	989; 10.44s	1050; 7.96m	804; 15.23m	859; 2.06m	852; 49.19s	958; 14.13s	873; 50.11m	880; 4.90m	885; 69.71m	670; 4:41.65s
3rd place, bronze medalist(s)	Dmitriy Karpov	Kazakhstan	8725 (AS)	975; 10.50s	1012; 7.81m	847; 15.93m	887; 2.09m	968; 46.81s	978; 13.97s	905; 51.65m	790; 4.60m	671; 55.54m	692; 4:38.11s
4	Dean Macey	Great Britain	8414 (SB)	885; 10.89s	927; 7.47m	835; 15.73m	944; 2.15m	863; 48.97s	903; 14.56s	836; 48.34m	731; 4.40m	715; 58.46m	775; 4:25.42s
5	Chiel Warners	Netherlands	8343 (SB)	947; 10.62s	995; 7.74m	758; 14.48m	776; 1.97m	911; 47.97s	973; 14.01s	741; 43.73m	880; 4.90m	669; 55.39m	693; 4:38.05s
6	Attila Zsivoczky	Hungary	8287 (SB)	881; 10.91s	847; 7.14m	809; 15.31m	915; 2.12m	842; 49.40s	856; 14.95s	780; 45.62m	819; 4.70m	790; 63.45m	748; 4:29.54s
7	Laurent Hernu	France	8237 (SB)	867; 10.97s	859; 7.19m	768; 14.65m	831; 2.03m	874; 48.73s	942; 14.25s	761; 44.72m	849; 4.80m	704; 57.76m	782; 4:24.35s
8	Erki Nool	Estonia	8235	906; 10.80s	942; 7.53m	744; 14.26m	696; 1.88m	870; 48.81s	874; 14.80s	706; 42.05m	1035; 5.40m	758; 61.33m	704; 4:36.33s
9	Claston Bernard	Jamaica	8225 (NR)	931; 10.69s	930; 7.48m	777; 14.80m	915; 2.12m	855; 49.13s	953; 14.17s	762; 44.75m	731; 4.40m	667; 55.27m	704; 4:36.31s
10	Roland Schwarzl	Austria	8102 (PB)	865; 10.98s	932; 7.49m	729; 14.01m	749; 1.94m	826; 49.76s	942; 14.25s	714; 42.43m	941; 5.10m	683; 56.32m	721; 4:33.56s
11	Aleksandr Pogorelov	Russia	8084 (SB)	872; 10.95s	888; 7.31m	796; 15.10m	859; 2.06m	779; 50.79s	948; 14.21s	759; 44.60m	910; 5.00m	640; 53.45m	633; 4:47.63s
12	Florian Schönbeck	Germany	8077	883; 10.90s	886; 7.30m	776; 14.77m	696; 1.88m	801; 50.30s	931; 14.34s	755; 44.41m	910; 5.00m	751; 60.89m	688; 4:38.82s
13	Romain Barras	France	8067 (SB)	830; 11.14s	811; 6.99m	784; 14.91m	749; 1.94m	842; 49.41s	927; 14.37s	763; 44.83m	790; 4.60m	807; 64.55m	764; 4:27.09s
14	Maurice Smith	Jamaica	8023	894; 10.85s	769; 6.81m	804; 15.24m	723; 1.91m	849; 49.27s	973; 14.01s	850; 49.02m	673; 4.20m	761; 61.52m	727; 4:32.74s
15	Nikolay Averyanov	Russia	8021	963; 10.55s	896; 7.34m	755; 14.44m	749; 1.94m	828; 49.72s	925; 14.39s	662; 39.88m	849; 4.80m	656; 54.51m	738; 4:31.02s
16	Jaakko Ojaniemi	Finland	8006 (SB)	933; 10.68s	935; 7.50m	788; 14.97m	749; 1.94m	856; 49.12s	848; 15.01s	672; 40.35m	790; 4.60m	727; 59.26m	708; 4:35.71s
17	Vitaliy Smirnov	Uzbekistan	7993	885; 10.89s	830; 7.07m	721; 13.88m	749; 1.94m	856; 49.11s	878; 14.77s	715; 42.47m	819; 4.70m	751; 60.88m	789; 4:23.31s
18	Qi Haifeng	China	7934	847; 11.06s	896; 7.34m	701; 13.55m	776; 1.97m	831; 49.65s	876; 14.78s	770; 45.13m	760; 4.50m	750; 60.79m	727; 4:32.63s
19	Stefan Drews	Germany	7924	890; 10.87s	905; 7.38m	672; 13.07m	696; 1.88m	885; 48.51s	973; 14.01s	667; 40.11m	910; 5.00m	611; 51.53m	715; 4:34.51s
20	Aliaksandr Parkhomenka	Belarus	7918 (SB)	830; 11.14s	723; 6.61m	832; 15.69m	831; 2.03m	767; 51.04s	864; 14.88s	703; 41.90m	849; 4.80m	826; 65.82m	693; 4:37.94s
21	Paul Terek	United States	7893	878; 10.92s	799; 6.94m	799; 15.15m	749; 1.94m	835; 49.56s	835; 15.12s	780; 45.62m	1004; 5.30m	598; 50.62m	616; 4:50.36s
22	David Gómez	Spain	7865	843; 11.08s	876; 7.26m	763; 14.57m	670; 1.85m	880; 48.61s	922; 14.41s	684; 40.95m	731; 4.40m	749; 60.71m	747; 4:29.70s
23	Indrek Turi	Estonia	7708	843; 11.08s	792; 6.91m	705; 13.62m	831; 2.03m	739; 51.67s	941; 14.26s	661; 39.83m	849; 4.80m	728; 59.34m	619; 4:50.01s
24	Santiago Lorenzo	Argentina	7592	838; 11.10s	821; 7.03m	681; 13.22m	670; 1.85m	845; 49.34s	804; 15.38s	669; 40.22m	760; 4.50m	713; 58.36m	791; 4:23.08s
25	Jānis Karlivāns	Latvia	7583	789; 11.33s	876; 7.26m	686; 13.30m	776; 1.97m	790; 50.54s	852; 14.98s	733; 43.34m	760; 4.50m	632; 52.92m	689; 4:38.67s
26	Prodromos Korkizoglou	Greece	7573	892; 10.86s	830; 7.07m	778; 14.81m	749; 1.94m	762; 51.16s	854; 14.96s	789; 46.07m	819; 4.70m	634; 53.05m	466; 5:17.00s
27	Hans Olav Uldal	Norway	7495	810; 11.23s	811; 6.99m	700; 13.53m	670; 1.85m	771; 50.95s	839; 15.09s	726; 43.01m	760; 4.50m	738; 60.00m	670; 4:41.70s
28	Paolo Casarsa	Italy	7404	782; 11.36s	739; 6.68m	785; 14.92m	749; 1.94m	673; 53.20s	803; 15.39s	843; 48.66s	731; 4.40m	717; 58.62m	582; 4:56.72s
29	Eugène Martineau	Netherlands	7185	863; 10.99s	776; 6.84m	0 NM	803; 2.00m	857; 49.10s	847; 15.02s	665; 40.00m	849; 4.80m	792; 63.62m	733; 4:31.79s
30	Victor Covalenco	Moldova	6543	799; 11.28s	862; 7.20m	670; 13.04m	670; 1.85m	733; 51.82s	755; 15.80s	628; 38.19m	0 NM	640; 53.46m	786; 4:23.81s
—N/a	Pavel Andreev	Uzbekistan	DNF	797; 11.29s	0 NM	747; 14.30m	803; 2.00m	741; 51.64s	785; 15.54s	703; 41.89m	880; 4.90m	DNS	DNS
—N/a	Tom Pappas	United States	DNF	906; 10.80s	905; 7.38m	862; 16.17m	831; 2.03m	911; 47.97s	951; 14.18s	816; 47.39m	0 NM	DNS	DNS
—N/a	Luiggy Llanos	Puerto Rico	DNF	874; 10.94s	918; 7.43m	714; 13.77m	723; 1.91m	848; 49.28s	958; 14.13s	702; 41.82m	0 NM	DNS	DNS
—N/a	Ahmad Hassan Moussa	Qatar	DNF	908; 10.79s	823; 7.04m	687; 13.32m	644; 1.82m	874; 48.73s	0 DNF	DNS	DNS	DNS	DNS
—N/a	Dennis Leyckes	Germany	DNF	850; 11.05s	826; 7.05m	657; 12.84m	723; 1.91m	DNS	DNS	DNS	DNS	DNS	DNS
—N/a	Jón Arnar Magnússon	Iceland	DNF	850; 11.05s	842; 7.12m	788; 14.98m	DNS	DNS	DNS	DNS	DNS	DNS	DNS
—N/a	Kristjan Rahnu	Estonia	DNF	912; 10.77s	0 NM	756; 14.45m	DNS	DNS	DNS	DNS	DNS	DNS	DNS
—N/a	Lev Lobodin	Russia	DNF	850; 11.05s	781; 6.86m	DNS	DNS	DNS	DNS	DNS	DNS	DNS	DNS
—N/a	Tomáš Dvořák	Czech Republic	DNF	746; 11.53s	DNS	DNS	DNS	DNS	DNS	DNS	DNS	DNS	DNS
