= Athletics at the 2003 Summer Universiade – Men's decathlon =

The men's decathlon competition at the 2003 Summer Universiade took place on 28 August and 29 August 2003 in the Daegu World Cup Stadium in Daegu, South Korea.

== Medalists ==
Gold	Romain Barras; France (FRA)
Silver	Indrek Turi; Estonia (EST)
Bronze	Nikolay Tishchenko; Russia (RUS)

== Records ==
World record	Roman Šebrle (CZE)	9026	27 May 2001	Götzis, Austria
Event record	Roman Šebrle (CZE)	8380	30 August 1997	Catania, Italy

== Results ==
The highest mark recorded in each event is highlighted in yellow.

Rank	Athlete	100m	LJ	SP	HJ	400m	110m H	DT	PV	JT	1500m	Points
1st place, gold medalist(s)	Romain Barras (FRA)	11.18	7.15	14.51	2.01	48.84	14.35	45.58	4.70	63.60	4:27.19	8196
2nd place, silver medalist(s)	Indrek Turi (EST)	11.05	7.07	14.31	2.10	49.72	14.36	40.23	5.00	62.84	4:39.69	8122
3rd place, bronze medalist(s)	Nikolay Tishchenko (RUS)	11.02	7.70	13.20	1.95	50.01	14.66	43.55	4.70	53.47	4:32.00	7911
4	Nikolay Averyanov (RUS)	10.82	7.52	14.07	1.95	50.11	14.71	39.90	4.80	50.42	4:31.69	7868
5	Aliaksandr Parkhomenka (BLR)	11.42	7.25	15.05	1.98	50.86	15.24	40.50	4.70	65.08	4:33.68	7847
6	Óscar González (ESP)	11.00	7.36	13.25	2.10	50.51	14.74	40.94	4.40	49.93	4:30.50	7755
7	Pavel Dubitski (KAZ)	11.15	7.27	12.69	2.13	51.18	15.04	41.84	4.80	52.69	4:48.14	7693
8	Kim Kun-woo (KOR)	11.36	7.45	12.25	1.98	49.10	15.41	38.85	4.60	52.13	4:13.72	7675
9	Clifford Caines (CAN)	11.31	6.57	13.40	1.98	50.81	15.56	38.39	4.00	54.78	4:21.41	7255
10	Mihai Timofte (ROM)	11.22	7.12	12.74	1.89	51.35	15.38	41.05	4.00	49.29	4:33.30	7171
11	Anders Black (DEN)	11.38	7.12	13.80	1.98	52.62	15.63	40.33	4.00	52.86	4:48.81	7139
12	Egons Lacis (LAT)	11.58	6.74	14.87	1.95	53.24	15.93	44.00	4.40	53.42	4:59.34	7121
13	Ranko Leskovar (SLO)	11.17	7.47	12.30	1.98	52.64	15.09	35.60	4.40	45.50	4:58.38	7094
	Josef Karas (CAN)	11.38	7.29	13.20	NM	DNS	–	–	–	–	–	DNF
	Luca Ceglie (ITA)	10.99	6.21	NM	DNS	–	–	–	–	–	–	DNF

== See also ==
- 2003 Decathlon Year Ranking
- 2003 World Championships in Athletics – Men's decathlon
- 2003 Hypo-Meeting
