= 2006 IAAF World Indoor Championships – Men's heptathlon =

Event at the 2006 IAAF World Indoor Championships

The men's heptathlon event at the 2006 IAAF World Indoor Championships was held on 11–12 March 2006.

The winning margin was 5 points which as of July 2024 remains the joint-narrowest winning margin in the men's heptathlon at these championships. The gold medallist achieved the best score in two of the seven events.

== Medallists ==
Gold	Silver	Bronze
André Niklaus; Germany	Bryan Clay; United States	Roman Šebrle; Czech Republic

== Results ==
=== 60 metres ===
Rank	Lane	Name	Nationality	Time	Points	Notes
1	3	Bryan Clay	United States	6.67	1003	SB
2	7	Kristjan Rahnu	Estonia	6.91	915	
3	5	Konstantin Smirnov	Russia	6.92	911	
4	6	Aleksey Drozdov	Russia	7.01	879	
5	4	André Niklaus	Germany	7.06	861	PB
6	2	Aleksandr Pogorelov	Russia	7.06	861	
7	8	Roman Šebrle	Czech Republic	7.10	847	SB

=== Long jump ===
Rank	Athlete	Nationality	#1	#2	#3	Result	Points	Notes	Overall
1	Roman Šebrle	Czech Republic	7.74	7.76	7.56	7.76	1000	SB	1847
2	Bryan Clay	United States	7.68	X	7.74	7.74	995	SB	1998
3	André Niklaus	Germany	7.64	–	–	7.64	970	PB	1831
4	Aleksandr Pogorelov	Russia	7.32	7.17	7.43	7.43	918		1779
5	Aleksey Drozdov	Russia	X	7.40	7.41	7.41	913		1792
6	Kristjan Rahnu	Estonia	7.33	X	X	7.33	893	PB	1808
7	Konstantin Smirnov	Russia	7.24	4.83	6.93	7.24	871	SB	1782

=== Shot put ===
Rank	Athlete	Nationality	#1	#2	#3	Result	Points	Notes	Overall
1	Aleksey Drozdov	Russia	15.91	16.48	16.64	16.64	891		2683
2	Kristjan Rahnu	Estonia	15.78	X	X	15.78	838	PB	2646
3	Roman Šebrle	Czech Republic	14.03	15.74	X	15.74	835	SB	2682
4	Aleksandr Pogorelov	Russia	15.68	15.55	X	15.68	832		2611
5	André Niklaus	Germany	13.80	X	14.41	14.41	753	PB	2584
6	Bryan Clay	United States	X	13.89	13.78	13.89	722		2720
7	Konstantin Smirnov	Russia	12.60	12.16	X	12.60	643		2425

=== High jump ===
Rank	Athlete	Nationality	1.89	1.92	1.95	1.98	2.01	2.04	2.07	2.10	2.13	Result	Points	Notes	Overall
1	Bryan Clay	United States	–	–	o	–	xo	o	xxo	o	xxx	2.10	896	PB	3616
2	Roman Šebrle	Czech Republic	–	–	o	–	xxo	o	xxo	xo	xxx	2.10	896	SB	3578
3	André Niklaus	Germany	o	o	o	o	xo	o	o	xxx		2.07	868	PB	3452
4	Aleksandr Pogorelov	Russia	–	–	–	xo	o	xo	o	xxx		2.07	868		3479
5	Aleksey Drozdov	Russia	–	o	o	xo	xxo	xxo	xo	xxx		2.07	868		3551
6	Kristjan Rahnu	Estonia	o	o	o	o	o	xo	xxx			2.04	840		3486
7	Konstantin Smirnov	Russia	o	xo	o	xxo	o	xxx				2.01	813	PB	3238

=== 60 metres hurdles ===
Rank	Lane	Name	Nationality	Time	Points	Notes	Overall
1	3	Bryan Clay	United States	7.83	1025	SB	4641
2	8	Konstantin Smirnov	Russia	8.00	982	PB	4220
3	2	Kristjan Rahnu	Estonia	8.01	979		4465
4	6	Aleksandr Pogorelov	Russia	8.04	972		4451
5	7	Roman Šebrle	Czech Republic	8.08	962		4540
6	5	André Niklaus	Germany	8.14	947		4399
7	4	Aleksey Drozdov	Russia	8.47	867		4418

=== Pole vault ===
Rank	Athlete	Nationality	4.40	4.50	4.60	4.70	4.80	4.90	5.00	5.10	5.20	5.30	5.40	Result	Points	Notes	Overall
1	André Niklaus	Germany	–	–	–	–	–	–	o	o	o	o	xxx	5.30	1004		5403
2	Kristjan Rahnu	Estonia	o	o	–	o	o	o	xxx					4.90	880	PB	5345
3	Aleksey Drozdov	Russia	–	o	–	o	o	xo	xxx					4.90	880	PB	5298
4	Aleksandr Pogorelov	Russia	–	–	–	–	xo	–	xxx					4.80	849		5300
5	Roman Šebrle	Czech Republic	o	–	o	–	xxo	xxx						4.80	849		5389
6	Konstantin Smirnov	Russia	–	o	o	xo	xxx							4.70	819		5039
7	Bryan Clay	United States	–	–	o	xxx								4.60	790	SB	5431

=== 1000 metres ===
Rank	Name	Nationality	Time	Points	Notes
1	André Niklaus	Germany	2:47.80	789	
2	Roman Šebrle	Czech Republic	2:49.38	772	
3	Konstantin Smirnov	Russia	2:50.90	756	
4	Bryan Clay	United States	2:50.92	756	SB
5	Aleksey Drozdov	Russia	2:51.07	754	
6	Kristjan Rahnu	Estonia	2:54.70	717	
7	Aleksandr Pogorelov	Russia	3:05.66	610	

=== Final results ===
The highest mark recorded in each event is highlighted in yellow

Rank	Athlete	Nationality	60m	LJ	SP	HJ	60m H	PV	1000m	Points	Notes
1st place, gold medalist(s)	André Niklaus	Germany	7.06	7.64	14.41	2.07	8.14	5.30	2:47.80	6192	PB
2nd place, silver medalist(s)	Bryan Clay	United States	6.67	7.74	13.89	2.10	7.83	4.60	2:50.92	6187	SB
3rd place, bronze medalist(s)	Roman Šebrle	Czech Republic	7.10	7.76	15.74	2.10	8.08	4.80	2:49.38	6131	SB
4	Kristjan Rahnu	Estonia	6.91	7.33	15.78	2.04	8.01	4.90	2:54.70	6062	PB
5	Aleksey Drozdov	Russia	7.01	7.41	16.64	2.07	8.47	4.90	2:51.07	6052	
6	Aleksandr Pogorelov	Russia	7.06	7.43	15.68	2.07	8.04	4.80	3:05.66	5910	
7	Konstantin Smirnov	Russia	6.92	7.24	12.60	2.01	8.00	4.70	2:50.90	5795	
