= Ojaniemi =

Ojaniemi is a Finnish surname. Notable people with the surname include:

- Jaakko Ojaniemi (born 1980), Finnish decathlete
- Taina Ojaniemi (born 1976), Finnish javelin thrower
