= Pavel Dubitskiy =

Kazakhstani decathlete

Medal record

Men's athletics

Representing Kazakhstan

Asian Championships
Silver medal – second place	2003 Manila	Decathlon

Asian Indoor Championships
Gold medal – first place	2004 Tehran	Heptathlon
Gold medal – first place	2006 Pattaya	Heptathlon

Pavel Dubitskiy (born 27 August 1982) is a retired Kazakhstani athlete competing in the decathlon and indoor heptathlon. He won multiple medals at the regional level.

He has personal bests of 7693 points in the decathlon and 5634 points in the heptathlon, both from 2003.

== Competition record ==
Year	Competition	Venue	Position	Event	Notes
Representing Kazakhstan
1999	World Youth Championships	Bydgoszcz, Poland	4th	High jump	2.10 m
1999	Asian Junior Championships	Singapore	4th	High jump	2.12 m
2000	World Junior Championships	Santiago, Chile	7th	Decathlon	6998 pts
2001	Asian Junior Championships	Bandar Seri Begawan, Brunei	1st	Decathlon	7051 pts
2001	Universiade	Beijing, China	–	Decathlon	DNF
2003	Universiade	Daegu, South Korea	7th	Decathlon	7693 pts
2003	Asian Championships	Manila, Philippines	2nd	Decathlon	7604 pts
2004	Asian Indoor Championships	Tehran, Iran	1st	Heptathlon	5570 pts
2005	Asian Championships	Incheon, South Korea	–	Decathlon	DNF
2005	Asian Indoor Games	Pattaya, Thailand	1st	Heptathlon	5549 pts
2006	Asian Indoor Championships	Pattaya, Thailand	1st	Heptathlon	5619 pts
2006	Asian Games	Doha, Qatar	5th	Decathlon	7374 pts
2007	Asian Championships	Amman, Jordan	–	Decathlon	DNF
2007	Asian Indoor Games	Macau, China	2nd	Heptathlon	5432 pts
2008	Asian Indoor Championships	Doha, Qatar	–	Heptathlon	DNF
2009	Asian Indoor Games	Hanoi, Vietnam	–	Heptathlon	DNF
