= Rudy Bourguignon =

French decathlete

Rudy Bourguignon (born 16 July 1979 in Léhon) is a French decathlete. His personal best result is 8025 points, achieved in September 2005 in Talence. He is married with Dutch heptathlete Laurien Hoos.

== Achievements ==
Year	Competition	Venue	Position	Event	Notes
Representing France
1998	World Junior Championships	Annecy, France	9th	Decathlon	6975 pts
2001	European U23 Championships	Amsterdam, Netherlands	13th	Decathlon	7159 pts
2005	Mediterranean Games	Almería, Spain	2nd	Decathlon	7886 pts
2005	Décastar	Talence, France	6th	Decathlon	8025 pts
2006	Hypo-Meeting	Götzis, Austria	—	Decathlon	DNF
2006	European Championships	Gothenburg, Sweden	15th	Decathlon	7617 pts
2007	European Indoor Championships	Birmingham, England	7th	Heptathlon	5737 pts
2007	Hypo-Meeting	Götzis, Austria	—	Decathlon	DNF
