= Florian Schönbeck =

German decathlete

Florian Schönbeck (born 13 January 1974 in Munich, Bayern) is a German retired decathlete. His personal best result was 8127 points, achieved in September 2000 in Wesel. He was affiliated with the Leichtathletik Gemeinschaft Domspitzmilch Regensburg.

He competed in the decathlon at the 2004 Summer Olympics in Athens.

== Achievements ==
| Year | Competition | Venue | Position | Event | Notes |
Representing Germany
| 2001 | Hypo-Meeting | Götzis, Austria | 11th | Decathlon | 7891 |
| 2004 | Olympic Games | Athens, Greece | 12th | Decathlon | 8077 |
