= Nikolay Averyanov (decathlete) =

Russian decathlete

Nikolay Sergeyevich Averyanov (Russian: Николай Серге́евич Аверянов; born 4 February 1980 in Chelyabinsk) is a decathlete from Russia, who competed for his native country at the 2004 Summer Olympics in Athens, Greece. He set his personal best score (8048 points) in Tula on 24 June 2004.

== International competitions ==
Representing Russia
Year	Competition	Venue	Position	Event	Notes
2003	World Student Games	Daegu, South Korea	4th	Decathlon	
2004	Olympic Games	Athens, Greece	15th	Decathlon	

== Personal bests ==
- 100 metres - 10.65 (2004)
- 400 metres - 49.70 (2004)
- 1500 metres - 4:26.86 (2004)
- 110 metres hurdles - 14.39 (2004)
- High jump - 1.97 (2005)
- Pole vault - 4.80 (2004)
- Long jump - 7.60 (2004)
- Shot put - 14.55 (2004)
- Discus throw - 41.72 (2004)
- Javelin throw - 55.10 (2004)
- Decathlon – 8048 (2004)
