= Jaakko Ojaniemi =

Finnish decathlete (born 1980)

Jaakko Ojaniemi (born 28 August 1980, in Peräseinäjoki) is a Finnish former decathlete. After winning medals in junior level, he represented Finland several times in major athletics competitions.

Since his retirement, he has worked as fitness coach of formula 1 driver Valtteri Bottas.

== Achievements ==
Year	Competition	Venue	Position	Event	Notes
Representing Finland
1998	World Junior Championships	Annecy, France	3rd	Decathlon	7246 pts
1999	European Junior Championships	Riga, Latvia	2nd	Decathlon	7763 pts
2001	European U23 Championships	Amsterdam, Netherlands	2nd	Decathlon	7907 pts
2002	Hypo-Meeting	Götzis, Austria	5th	Decathlon	8117 pts
2002	European Championships	Munich, Germany	5th	Decathlon	8192 pts
2004	Olympic Games	Athens, Greece	16th	Decathlon	8006 pts
2005	World Championships	Helsinki, Finland	9th	Decathlon	8042 pts
2005	Décastar	Talence, France	11th	Decathlon	7815 pts
2006	European Championships	Gothenburg, Sweden	—	Decathlon	DNF
2008	Finnish Championships	Tampere, Finland	1st	Decathlon	7517 pts
