= Aliaksandr Parkhomenka =

Belarusian decathlete

Aliaksandr Parkhomenka (Belarusian: Аляксандар Пархоменка; born 22 March 1981) is a Belarusian decathlete.

== Achievements ==
Year	Competition	Venue	Position	Event	Notes
Representing Belarus
2003	European U23 Championships	Bydgoszcz, Poland	15th	Decathlon	7037 pts
2003	Universiade	Daegu, South Korea	5th	Decathlon	7847 pts
2004	Hypo-Meeting	Götzis, Austria	15th	Decathlon	7854 pts
2004	Olympic Games	Athens, Greece	20th	Decathlon	7918 pts
2005	Universiade	İzmir, Turkey	1st	Decathlon	8051 pts
2006	European Championships	Gothenburg, Sweden	6th	Decathlon	8136 pts
2008	Olympic Games	Beijing, China	17th	Decathlon	7838 pts
