= Indrek Turi =

Estonian decathlete

Personal information
- Nationality: Estonian
- Born: 30 July 1981 (age 44) Tallinn, then part of Estonian SSR, Soviet Union
- Height: 190 cm (75 in)
- Weight: 84 kg (185 lb)

Sport
- Country: Estonia
- Event: Decathlon

Achievements and titles
- Personal best(s): Decathlon: 8122; Heptathlon: 5677

Indrek Turi (born 30 July 1981 in Tallinn) is a retired Estonian decathlete. His coach is Andrei Nazarov.

Turi lives near Räpina in Võõpsu village, Mikitamäe Parish.

== Achievements ==
Year	Competition	Venue	Position	Event	Result
Representing Estonia
2000	World Junior Championships	Santiago, Chile	5th	Decathlon	7222 pts
2001	Universiade	Beijing, China	6th	Decathlon	7628 pts
2003	European U23 Championships	Bydgoszcz, Poland	2nd	Decathlon	7864 pts
2003	Universiade	Daegu, South Korea	2nd	Decathlon	8122 pts (PB)
2004	Olympic Games	Athens, Greece	23rd	Decathlon	7708 pts

== Personal bests (outdoor) ==
Event	Result	Date	Place
100 Metres	11.00	29 08 2001	Beijing
400 Metres	49.72	28 08 2003	Daegu
1500 Metres	4:26.13	16 07 2000	Tartu
110 Metres Hurdles	14.36 (+1.6)	29 08 2003	Daegu
High Jump	2.10	28 08 2003	Daegu
Pole Vault	5.00	18 07 2003	Bydgoszcz
Long Jump	7.23 (+1.5)	03 07 2004	Tallinn
Shot Put	14.46	15 07 2006	Tartu
Discus Throw	40.23	29 08 2003	Daegu
Javelin Throw	62.84	29 08 2003	Daegu
Decathlon	8122	29 08 2003	Daegu
