= Kalbach-Riedberg =

Frankfurt am Main
- Borough of Frankfurt am Main
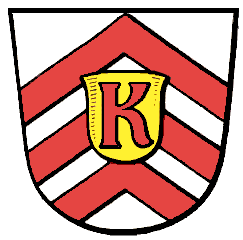
- Coat of arms

- Location of Kalbach-Riedberg within Frankfurt am Main
- Interactive map of Frankfurt am Main
- Location within Germany Location within Hesse
- Coordinates: 50°11′05″N 08°38′22″E
- Country: Germany
- State: Hesse
- Admin. region: Darmstadt
- District: Urban district
- City: Frankfurt am Main

Area
  - Total: 6.10 km^{2} (2.36 sq mi)

Population (2020-12-31)
  - Total: 22,170
  - Density: 3,630/km^{2} (9,410/sq mi)
- Time zone: UTC+01:00 (CET)
  - Summer (DST): UTC+02:00 (CEST)
- Postal codes: 420
- Dialling codes: 69
- Vehicle registration: F
- Website: www.kalbach-riedberg.de

Kalbach-Riedberg (German pronunciation: [ˈkalbax ˈʁiːtbɛʁk]) is a borough (Ortsbezirk) of Frankfurt am Main, Germany. It is subdivided into the Stadtbezirke Kalbach and Riedberg. Kalbach has a long history and has been mentioned in documented sources as early as year 772. 1200 years later, in 1972, Kalbach was incorporated into Frankfurt am Main. The Riedberg area of Kalbach-Riedberg has a more recent history. As a way to combat housing shortage in Frankfurt am Main, a project to create housing space for about 20,000 was initiated here in 2001. As of 2020, Kalbach-Riedberg has a population of 22,170.
