= Paolo Casarsa =

Italian decathlete

Personal information
- Nationality: Italian
- Born: 2 July 1975 (age 50) Udine

Sport
- Sport: Athletics
- Event: Combined events

Achievements and titles
- Personal bests: Decathlon: 8026 (2004); Heptathlon indoor: 5664 (2001)

Paolo Casarsa (born 2 July 1975) is a male decathlete from Italy.

== Biography ==
He represented his native country at the 2004 Summer Olympics in Athens, Greece. A two-time national champion in the men's decathlon (2002 and 2003) he set his personal best score (8056 points) on 6 June 2004 at a meet in Vienna, Austria. His father Franco Casarsa was a javelin thrower.

== Achievements ==
| Year | Competition | Venue | Position | Event | Notes |
|---|---|---|---|---|---|
| 1997 | European U23 Championships | Turku, Finland | — | Decathlon | DNF |
| 2001 | Mediterranean Games | Tunis, Tunisia | 3rd | Decathlon | 7522 pts |
| 2002 | European Championships | Munich, Germany | 10th | Decathlon | 7807 pts |
| 2003 | Hypo-Meeting | Götzis, Austria | — | Decathlon | DNF |
| 2003 | World Championships | Paris, France | — | Decathlon | DNF |
| 2004 | Olympic Games | Athens, Greece | 28th | Decathlon | 7404 pts |

== See also ==
- Italian all-time lists - Decathlon
