= Ahrensburger TSV =

German sports club

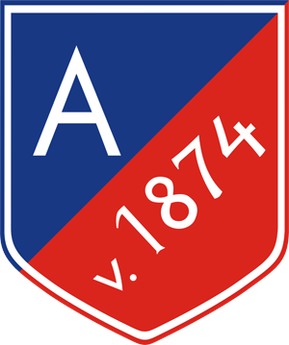
- Full name: Ahrensburger Turn- und Sportverein von 1874 e.V.
- Founded: 1874; 151 years ago
- League: Kreisliga Hamburg 6 (VIII)
- 2015–16: 6th
- Website: https://www.atsv.de
Home colours	Away colours

Ahrensburger TSV is a German sports club from the city of Ahrensburg, Schleswig-Holstein. In the late 1950s and early 1960s, the club's football team fielded a side in the third division Amateurliga Hamburg.

== History ==
The origins of the club go back to the formation on 20 July 1874 of the gymnastics club Ahrensburger Männerturnverein. This club was lost but re-established on 31 July 1882 as Ahrensburger Turnerbund 1882 before reaching back to claim the traditions of the original side the next year and adopting the name Ahrensburger TB 1874.

A football department was established within the association in 1910 and in 1921 became independent as Sport Klub Ahrensburg. This team briefly played as part of the combined side Fußballspielgemeinschaft SK Ahrensburg/FC Bargteheide in 1932–34. Following World War II weakened clubs often merged and the original Ahrensburger TB club joined SK and Ahrensburger Tennis- und Hockeyclub to form Ahrensburger Turn- und Sportverein 1874. The restored side undertook an ambitious program and established 17 different sporting departments.

In 1953, VfL Ahrensburg 1910 was formed as a separate side out of TSV. This club adopted the name FC Ahrensburg in 1957 and laid claim to the traditions of SK Ahrensburg 1910 before returning to once again become part of TSV in 2001.

ATSV's football team spent four seasons in the Amateurliga Hamburg (III) between 1957 and 1962, but was a lower table side that never finished better than 13th. Today the team plays in the Kreisliga Hamburg (VIII).
