= Dennis Leyckes =

German decathlete

Dennis Leyckes (born 20 April 1982 in Krefeld) is a German decathlete.

His personal best score is 8310 points, achieved in June 2006 in Ratingen.

His father Dieter Leyckes won the decathlon silver medal at the 1979 European Junior Championships. He is coached by Torsten Voss.

== Achievements ==
Year	Competition	Venue	Position	Event	Notes
Representing Germany
2000	World Junior Championships	Santiago, Chile	1st	Decathlon	7897 pts
2002	Hypo-Meeting	Götzis, Austria	—	Decathlon	DNF
2004	Olympic Games	Athens, Greece	—	Decathlon	DNF
2005	Hypo-Meeting	Götzis, Austria	—	Decathlon	DNF
2006	European Championships	Gothenburg, Sweden	—	Decathlon	DNF
2007	European Indoor Championships	Birmingham, England	4th	Heptathlon	5962 pts
2007	Hypo-Meeting	Götzis, Austria	—	Decathlon	DNF
