= Tom Pappas =

American track & field decathlete (born 1976)

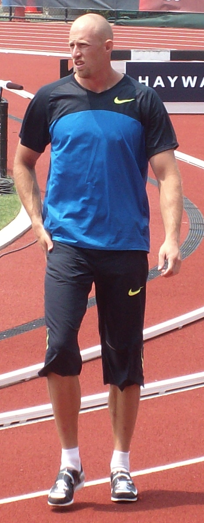
- Pappas in Eugene (2008)

Personal information
- Nationality: United States
- Born: September 6, 1976 (age 49) Azalea, Oregon, U.S.
- Height: 6 ft 5 in (196 cm)
- Weight: 216 lb (98 kg)

Sport
- Sport: Athletics
- Event: Decathlon
- College team: Lane Titans (1995-96); Tennessee Volunteers (1997, 1999)

Achievements and titles
- Personal bests: Decathlon: 8,784 pts (2003); Heptathlon: 6,361 pts (2003)
Medal record
Representing United States
World Championships
| Gold medal – first place | 2003 Paris | Decathlon |
World Indoor Championships
| Gold medal – first place | 2003 Birmingham | Heptathlon |
|}

Tom Pappas (born September 6, 1976) is a retired American decathlete.

== Early life ==
Pappas was born in Azalea, Oregon. He graduated from Glendale High School in 1994, and from the University of Tennessee in 1999.

== Career ==
Pappas is a four-time U.S. champion (2000, 2002, 2003, 2006) and was the 1999 NCAA champion while attending the University of Tennessee. Before his time at Tennessee, Pappas also competed in the Northwest Athletic Conference for the Lane Titans track and field team. He won the gold medal at the 2003 World Championships and was rated number 1 in the world that year by Track & Field News. His personal best in the decathlon is 8,784 points while winning the 2003 US Championships held at Stanford University.

He won the 2003 Jesse Owens Award from USATF, an award given to the Athlete of the Year.

Pappas finished fifth at the 2000 Olympic decathlon. He placed third in the decathlon at the 2008 United States Olympic trials (track and field) in Eugene, Oregon, but was unable to complete the decathlon in Beijing due to a plantar fasciitis injury.

== Post-career ==
Pappas is the co-owner of Lane 5 Crossfit in Eugene, Oregon.

== Achievements ==
| Year | Tournament | Venue | Result | Event |
|---|---|---|---|---|
| 1999 | World Championships | Seville | DNF | Decathlon |
| 2000 | Olympic Games | Sydney | 5th | Decathlon |
| 2001 | Goodwill Games | Brisbane | 3rd | Decathlon |
| 2003 | World Indoor Championships | Birmingham | 1st | Heptathlon |
| 2003 | World Championships | Paris | 1st | Decathlon |
| 2004 | Hypo-Meeting | Götzis | 2nd | Decathlon |
| 2004 | Olympic Games | Athens | DNF | Decathlon |
| 2008 | Olympic Games | Beijing | DNF | Decathlon |

== Personal bests ==
Outdoor

Individual events
| Event | Performance | Location | Date |
|---|---|---|---|
| Long jump | 7.57 m (24 ft 10 in) | Indianapolis | July 7, 2000 |
| High jump | 2.10 m (6 ft 10 1/2 in) | Knoxville | April 10, 2004 |
| 100 meters | 10.5h | Indianapolis | July 7, 2000 |
| 100 meters | 10.63 (+2.3 m/s) | Knoxville | April 25, 2004 |
| 100 meters | 10.90 (+1.9 m/s) | Columbia | April 13, 2006 |
| 400 meters | 48.22 | Knoxville | May 1, 1999 |
| 110 meters hurdles | 13.7h | Indianapolis | July 7, 2000 |
| 110 meters hurdles | 13.94 (+1.2 m/s) | Athens, GA | May 15, 1999 |
| Pole vault | 5.20 m (17 ft 1/2 in) | Indianapolis | July 7, 2000 |
| Discus throw | 51.61 m (169 ft 3 3/4 in) | El Paso | April 12, 2008 |
| Javelin throw | 66.12 m (216 ft 11 in) | Knoxville | April 15, 2000 |

Combined events
| Event | Performance | Location | Date | Score |
|---|---|---|---|---|
| Decathlon | —N/a | Palo Alto | June 22, 2003 | 8,784 points |
| 100 meters | 10.65 (−0.2 m/s) | Götzis | May 31, 2003 | 940 points |
| Long jump | 7.96 m (26 ft 1 1/4 in)(+1.4 m/s) | Palo Alto | June 21, 2003 | 1,050 points |
| Shot put | 17.26 m (56 ft 7 1/2 in) | Eugene | June 29, 2008 | 929 points |
| High jump | 2.21 m (7 ft 3 in) | Sydney | September 27, 2000 | 1,002 points |
| 400 meters | 47.58 | Saint-Denis | August 26, 2003 | 930 points |
| 110 meters hurdles | 13.90 (+0.3 m/s) | Götzis | May 30, 2004 | 987 points |
| Discus throw | 51.57 m (169 ft 2 1/4 in) | Marburg | August 9, 2009 | 903 points |
| Pole vault | 5.20 m (17 ft 1/2 in) | Eugene | June 30, 2008 | 972 points |
| Javelin throw | 65.90 m (216 ft 2 1/4 in) | Saint-Denis | August 27, 2003 | 827 points |
| 1500 meters | 4:44.31 | Saint-Denis | August 27, 2003 | 653 points |
| Virtual Best Performance | | | | 9,193 points |

Indoor

Individual events
| Event | Performance | Location | Date |
|---|---|---|---|
| 800 meters | 2:02.94 | Manhattan, KS | February 15, 2007 |
| Mile | 5:03.53 | New Haven | January 13, 2007 |
| 55 meters hurdles | 7.27 | Knoxville | February 21, 2003 |
| 60 meters hurdles | 7.92 | Blacksburg | January 16, 1999 |
| Long jump | 7.35 m (24 ft 1 1/4 in) | Gainesville | February 20, 1999 |
| High jump | 2.08 m (6 ft 9 3/4 in) | Blacksburg | February 6, 1999 |
| Pole vault | 5.18 m (16 ft 11 3/4 in) | Lexington | February 7, 2003 |
| Shot put | 16.83 m (55 ft 2 1/2 in) | Manhattan, KS | January 18, 2008 |

Combined events
| Event | Performance | Location | Date | Score |
|---|---|---|---|---|
| Heptathlon | —N/a | Birmingham | March 15–16, 2003 | 6,361 points |
| 60 meters | 6.89 | Birmingham | March 15, 2003 | 922 points |
| Long jump | 7.56 m (24 ft 9 1/2 in) | Birmingham | March 15, 2003 | 950 points |
| Shot put | 16.23 m (53 ft 2 3/4 in) | Birmingham | March 15, 2003 | 865 points |
| High jump | 2.21 m (7 ft 3 in) | Athens, GA | March 3, 2000 | 1,002 points |
| 60 meters hurdles | 7.80 | Birmingham | March 16, 2003 | 1,033 points |
| Pole vault | 5.03 m (16 ft 6 in) | Chapel Hill | March 2, 2002 | 920 points |
| 1000 meters | 2:49.32 | Chapel Hill | March 7, 2004 | 773 points |
| Virtual Best Performance | | | | 6,465 points |

Awards
| Preceded by (United States) Tim Montgomery | Men's Track & Field ESPY Award; 2004 | Succeeded by {{{after}}} |
