= Stefan Drews =

German decathlete

Stefan Drews (born 12 February 1979 in Hamburg) is a retired German decathlete.

He finished 4th in the decathlon at the 1998 World Junior Championships in Athletics. He finished 7th in the decathlon at the 2006 European Athletics Championships in Gothenburg.

He also competed in the 2004 Summer Olympics, where he ranked 19th.
