= David Gómez (decathlete) =

Spanish decathlete

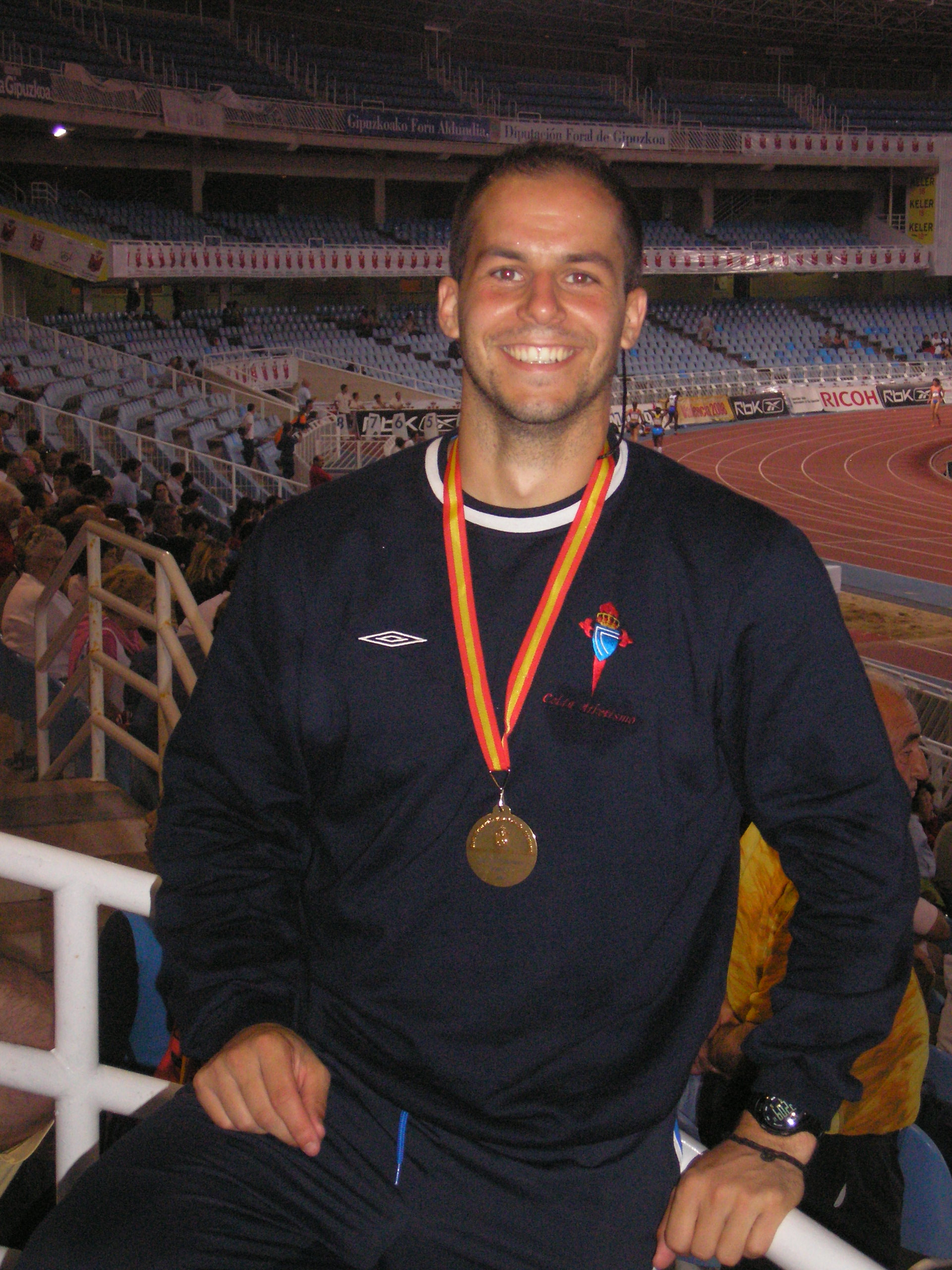

Personal information
- Full name: David Gómez Martínez
- Nationality: Spain
- Born: 13 February 1981 (age 45) O Rosal, Pontevedra, Spain
- Height: 1.85 m (6 ft 1 in)
- Weight: 90 kg (198 lb)
- Website: http://davidgomezmartinez.es

Sport
- Sport: Athletics
- Event: Decathlon
- Club: Celta de Vigo
- Coached by: Jesus Lence

Achievements and titles
- Personal best: Decathlon: 7,904 points (2004)
Medal record
Men's athletics
Representing Spain
World Junior Championships
Silver medal – second place	2000 Santiago	Decathlon
Ibero-American Championships
Gold medal – first place	2004 Huelva	Decathlon
Silver medal – second place	2006 Ponce	Decathlon

David Gómez Martínez (born February 13, 1981, in O Rosal, Pontevedra) is a Spanish decathlete. He is a two-time national junior champion, an eleven-time national senior champion, and a two-time Olympian. He also won two silver medals for the decathlon at the 2000 IAAF World Junior Championships in Santiago, Chile, and at the 2006 Ibero-American Championships in Ponce, Puerto Rico.

In 2004, Gomez set both his personal best and a championship record of 7,904 points, by winning the gold medal at the Ibero-American Championships in Huelva. Shortly after his first international success, Gomez was eventually selected to compete for Spain at the 2004 Summer Olympics in Athens, where he placed twenty-fifth in the men's decathlon event, with a solid score of 7,865 points.

At the 2008 Summer Olympics in Beijing, Gomez competed for the second time in men's decathlon, despite having a serious physical injury. During the competition, he set seasonal bests in the 100 metres (11.12 seconds), discus throw (40.17 m), and javelin throw (62.22 m), as well as his personal best in the 1500 metres (4:30.74). Gomez, however, failed to clear a height in the pole vault, which cost him a chance for a medal. In the end, he finished abruptly in twenty-fifth place, with a total score of 6,876 points.

Gomez is a full-time member of Club Atletico Celta de Vigo in Vigo, Spain, being currently coached and trained by Jesus Lence.

== Personal bests ==
Event	Performance	Location	Date
100 metres	10.95	Alhama de Murcia	June 3, 2000
400 metres	47.81	Santiago	October 18, 2000
1500 metres	4:24.55	Santiago	October 19, 2000
110 metres hurdles	14.09	Málaga	July 23, 2005
Long jump	7.43	Santa Cruz de Tenerife	July 26, 2008
High jump	1.97	Vigo	July 6, 2012
Pole vault	4.62	Vigo	July 7, 2012
Shot put	14.57	Athens	August 23, 2004
Discus throw	42.54	Cartagena	July 18, 2004
Javelin throw	66.99	Vigo	April 23, 2005
Decathlon	7940	Huelva	August 7, 2004
Heptathlon (indoor)	5434	Vilafranca	February 2, 2001
