= Thomas Pöge =

German bobsledder

Medal record

Men's Bobsleigh

Representing Germany

World Championships
Bronze medal – third place	2008 Altenberg	Four-man

Thomas Pöge (sometimes shown as Thomas Poege, born 6 May 1979) is a German bobsledder who has competed since 2002. He won the bronze medal in the four-man event at the 2008 FIBT World Championships in Altenberg, Germany.
