= Kristjan Rahnu =

Estonian decathlete

Personal information
- Born: 29 August 1979 (age 46) Kohila, then part of Estonian SSR, Soviet Union
- Height: 189 cm (74 in)
- Weight: 82 kg (181 lb)

Sport
- Country: Estonia
- Sport: Athletics
- Event: Decathlon

Achievements and titles
- Personal best(s): Decathlon: 8526; Heptathlon: 6062

Kristjan Rahnu (born 29 August 1979 in Kohila) is a retired Estonian decathlete. His personal best dates back to 2005 when he did 8526 points in France, Arles on June 4–5. After many injuries and other issues, Rahnu is trying to make a successful return to the sport in 2009 for the first time since the European World Championships in 2006.

== Achievements ==
Year	Competition	Venue	Position	Event	Result
Representing Estonia
1998	World Junior Championships	Annecy, France	—	Decathlon	DNF
2005	World Championships	Helsinki, Finland	6th	Decathlon	8223 pts
2005	Décastar	Talence, France	3rd	Decathlon	8124 pts
2006	World Indoor Championships	Moscow, Russia	4th	Heptathlon	6062 pts PB
2006	European Championships	Gothenburg, Sweden	9th	Decathlon	8083 pts

== Personal bests ==
Event	Result	Date	Place
100 Metres	10.48 (+0.5)	10 05 2002	Arlington, TX
400 Metres	48.58	09 08 2005	Helsinki
1500 Metres	4:50.80	11 08 2006	Göteborg
110 Metres Hurdles	14.20 (+0.5)	20 07 2003	Tartu
High Jump	2.07	04 02 2006	Tallinn
Pole Vault	4.96	03 06 2009	Tartu
Long Jump	7.58 (+1.6)	1.6 04 06 2005	Arles
Shot Put	16.38	14 03 2002	College Station, TX
Discus Throw	53.16	01 01 2002	New Orleans, LA
Javelin Throw	65.02	20 07 2003	Tartu
Decathlon	8526	05 06 2005	Arles
