= André Niklaus =

German decathlete

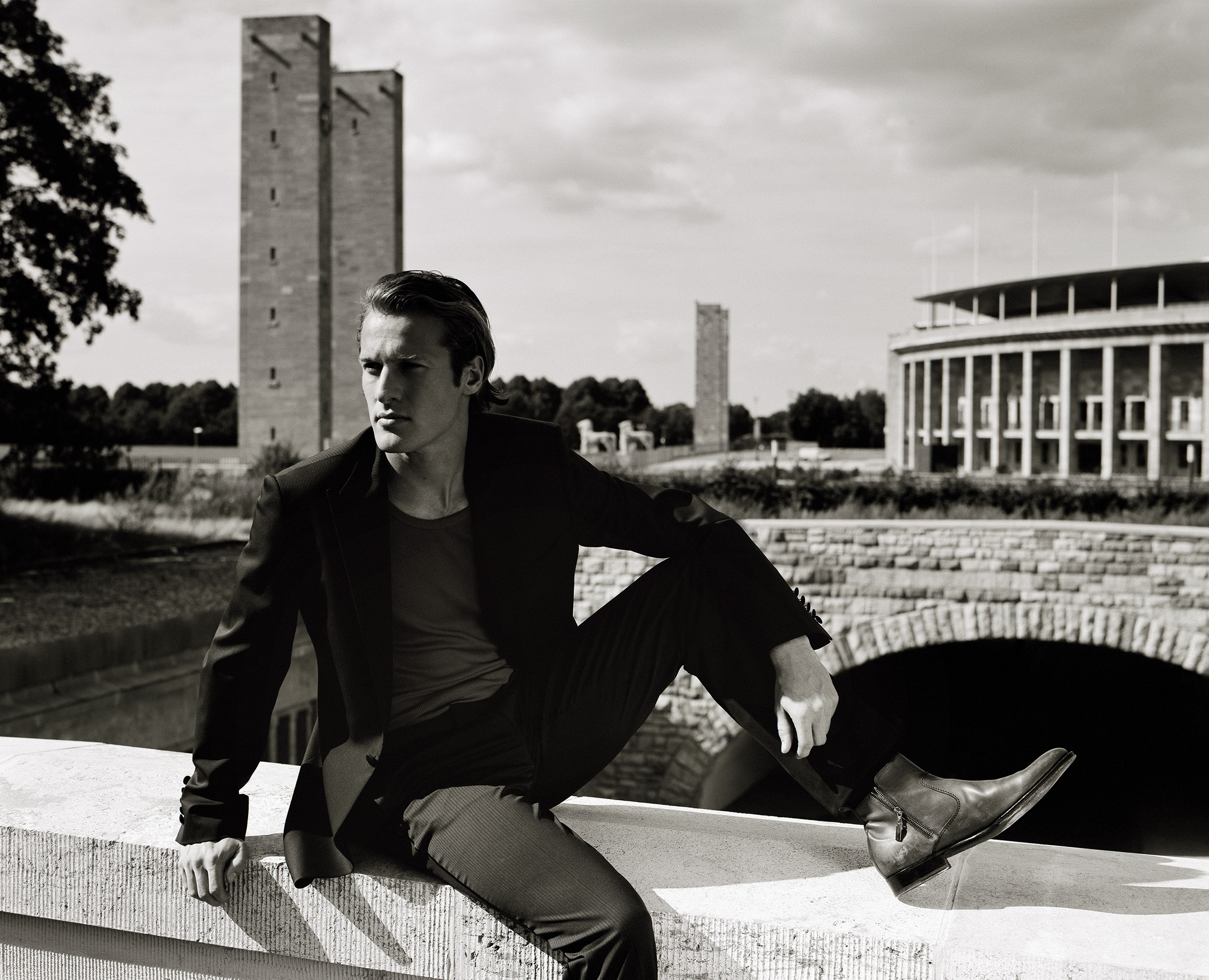
André Niklaus photographed by Oliver Mark, Berlin 2007

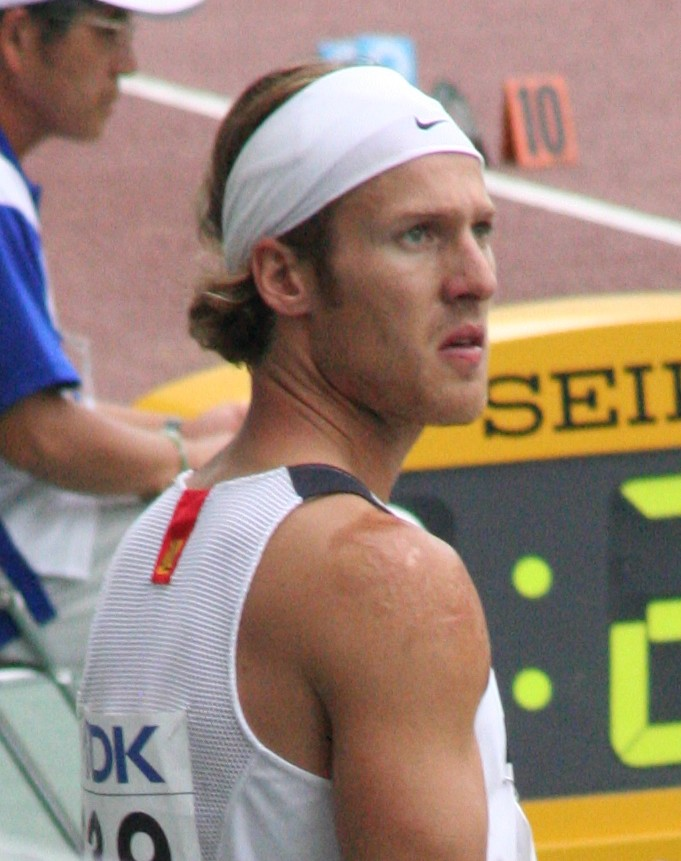
Niklaus at the 2007 World Championships in Athletics.

André Niklaus (born 30 August 1981 in Berlin) is a German decathlete.

== Achievements ==
Year	Competition	Venue	Position	Event	Notes
Representing Germany
1999	European Junior Championships	Riga, Latvia	4th	Decathlon	7339 pts PB
2000	World Junior Championships	Santiago, Chile	3rd	Decathlon	7712 pts PB
2001	Hypo-Meeting	Götzis, Austria	12th	Decathlon	7891 pts PB
2001	European U23 Championships	Amsterdam, Netherlands	1st	Decathlon	8042 pts
2003	European U23 Championships	Bydgoszcz, Poland	1st	Decathlon	7983 pts
2003	World Championships	Paris, France	8th	Decathlon	8020 pts PB
2004	Hypo-Meeting	Götzis, Austria	13th	Decathlon	7929 pts
2005	Hypo-Meeting	Götzis, Austria	7th	Decathlon	8074 pts PB
2005	World Championships	Helsinki, Finland	4th	Decathlon	8316 pts PB
2006	World Indoor Championships	Moscow, Russia	1st	Heptathlon	6192 pts iPB
2006	Hypo-Meeting	Götzis, Austria	4th	Decathlon	8239 pts PB
2007	Hypo-Meeting	Götzis, Austria	5th	Decathlon	8340 pts PB
2008	Hypo-Meeting	Götzis, Austria	—	Decathlon	DNF
