= Vitaliy Smirnov =

Uzbekistani decathlete

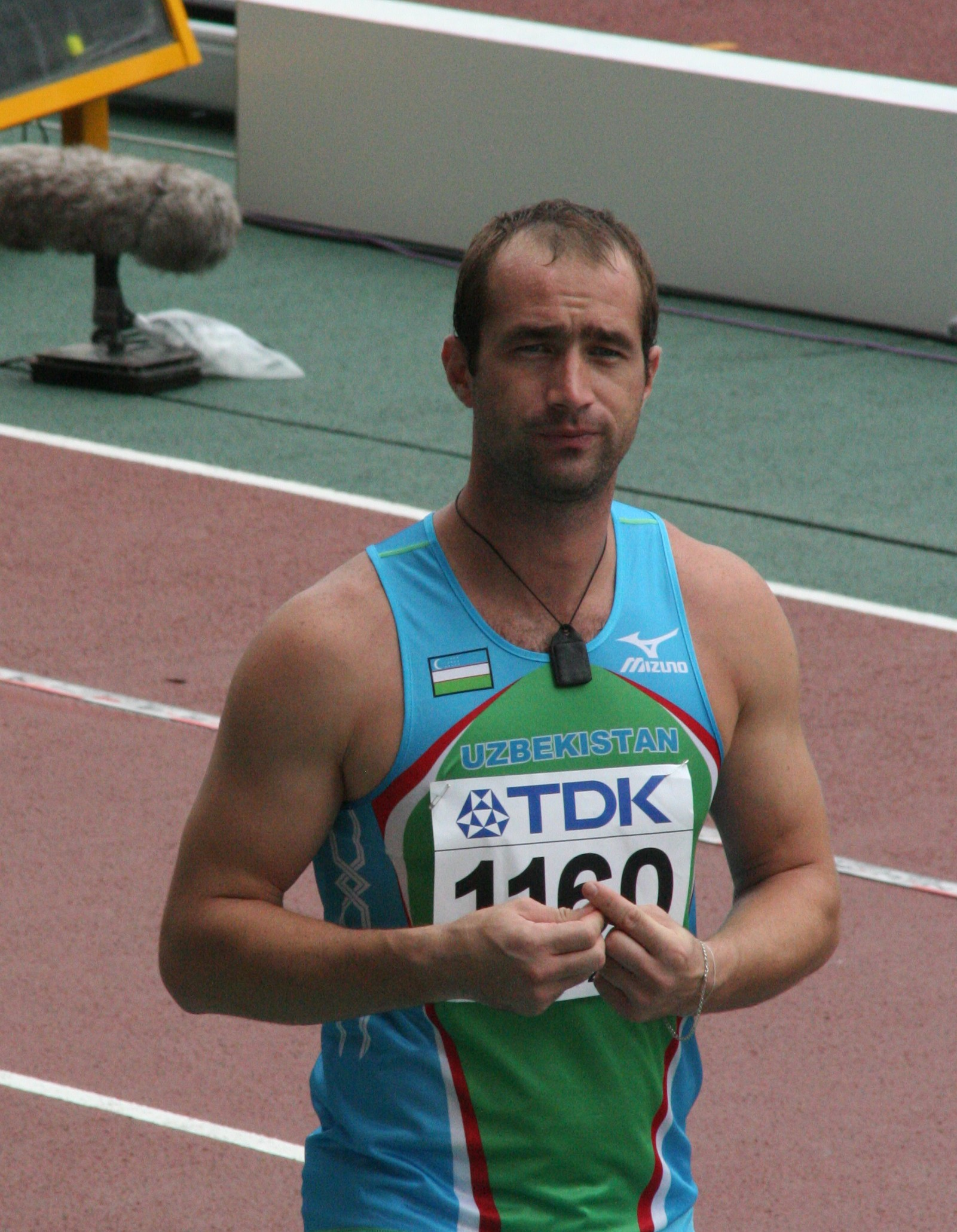
- Smirnov at the 2007 World Championships in Athletics

Medal record

Men's athletics

Representing Uzbekistan

Asian Championships
| Gold medal – first place | 2003 Manila | Decathlon |

Vitaly Frilyevich Smirnov (born 25 October 1978 in Yekaterinburg) is a Russian-Uzbekistani decathlete.

He finished tenth at the 2003 World Championships in Paris, won the gold medal at the 2003 Asian Championships in Manila in a personal best score of 8021 points, finished seventeenth at the 2004 Summer Olympics in Athens and won a silver medal at the 2006 Asian Games in Doha.

He participated in the 2007 Asian Championship in Amman and the World Championship in Osaka.

He finished fourth in the heptathlon at the 2008 Asian Indoor Athletics Championships in Doha. Being among the leaders of the Uzbek national team, he successfully passed the selection for the Olympic Games in Beijing - this time he failed all attempts in the long jump and withdrew from the competition after three stages.

== Competition record ==
| Year | Competition | Venue | Position | Event | Notes |
Representing Uzbekistan
| 1997 | Asian Junior Championships | Bangkok, Thailand | 3rd | Decathlon | 6683 pts |
| 2002 | Asian Championships | Colombo, Sri Lanka | 6th | Decathlon | 6710 pts |
| 2002 | Asian Games | Busan, South Korea | 4th | Decathlon | 7537 pts |
| 2003 | Asian Championships | Manila, Philippines | 1st | Decathlon | 8021 pts |
| 2003 | World Championships | Paris, France | 10th | Decathlon | 7897 pts |
| 2004 | Olympic Games | Athens, Greece | 17th | Decathlon | 7993 pts |
| 2005 | World Championships | Helsinki, Finland | – | Decathlon | DNF |
| 2006 | Asian Games | Doha, Qatar | 2nd | Decathlon | 7769 pts |
| 2007 | World Championships | Osaka, Japan | – | Decathlon | DNF |
| 2008 | Asian Indoor Championships | Doha, Qatar | 4th | Heptathlon | 5085 pts |
| 2008 | Olympic Games | Beijing, China | – | Decathlon | DNF |
