= Ahmad Hassan Moussa =

Qatari decathlete (born 1981)

Medal record

Men's athletics

Representing Qatar

Asian Games
Bronze medal – third place	2002 Busan	Decathlon

Asian Championships
Gold medal – first place	2002 Colombo	Decathlon
Gold medal – first place	2007 Amman	Decathlon

Military World Games
Bronze medal – third place	2007 Hyderabad	Decathlon

Ahmad Hassan Moussa (Arabic: احمد حسن موسى; born 17 June 1981) is a Qatari decathlete. He represented his country at the 2004 Summer Olympics and is a two time Asian Champion in the event (2002 and 2007).

Moussa was the bronze medallist at both the 2002 Asian Games and the 2007 Military World Games. He has won three Arab Athletics titles for Qatar and won the gold medal at the 2007 Pan Arab Games. His personal best of 7730 points is the Qatari national record for the decathlon.

== Career ==
Based in Al-Sadd, Doha, Moussa won the Arab junior decathlon title in 1998 and went on to finish twelfth with a personal best of 6872 points at the 1998 World Junior Championships in Athletics. He also won at the Gulf Cooperation Council Athletics Championships that year – the first of three straight victories from 1998 to 2002. He won the gold medal at the 1999 Asian Junior Athletics Championships, At the age of eighteen he was crowned the Arab champion in Beirut at the 1999 Arab Athletics Championships and improved his best total to 7482 points. He competed at the 2000 World Junior Championships in Athletics, only managing thirteenth place, and missed the 2001 season.

He returned to action in 2002 and established himself at the continental events. He won the gold at the 2002 West Asian Games and beat Pavel Andreev at the 2002 Asian Championships in Athletics to become the Asian decathlon champion. The peak of his season came at the 2002 Asian Games where he set a Qatari national record of 7683 points to take the bronze medal behind Qi Haifeng and Dmitriy Karpov. His best performance of 2003 came at the Arab Championships, where he won a third consecutive decathlon title with a score of 7373 points.

At the 2004 Mehrkampf-Meeting Ratingen he came sixth with a personal best score of 7730 points. This was enough to qualify him for the 2004 Olympic decathlon. However, he did not complete the Olympic event after failing to finish in the 110 metres hurdles. He was absent from competition in 2005.

Moussa set a heptathlon best of 4651 points at the 2006 Asian Indoor Athletics Championships, but this was not enough to reach the podium. He also missed out on the medals at the 2006 Asian Games in Doha, as his score of 7445 points left him in fourth place behind Kim Kun-Woo. Despite the disappointment of failing to medal on home soil, he went on to have one of his most successful seasons in 2007. At the 2007 Asian Athletics Championships, he edged Iran's Hadi Sepehrzad out of first place in the final 1500 metres event to claim his second Asian title. He was the bronze medallist at the 2007 Military World Games and won his second gold medal of the year at the 2007 Pan Arab Games
