= Pavel Andreev (decathlete) =

Uzbekistani decathlete

Personal information
- Full name: Pavel Vladimirovich Andreev
- Nationality: Uzbekistan
- Born: 24 November 1978 (age 47) Tashkent, Uzbek SSR
- Height: 1.95 m (6 ft 5 in)
- Weight: 94 kg (207 lb)

Sport
- Sport: Athletics
- Event: Decathlon

Achievements and titles
- Personal best: Decathlon: 8,036 points (2004)
Medal record
Men's athletics
Representing Uzbekistan
Asian Championships
Gold medal – first place	2005 Incheon	Decathlon
Silver medal – second place	2002 Colombo	Decathlon
Bronze medal – third place	2003 Manila	Decathlon
Bronze medal – third place	2007 Amman	Decathlon
Asian Indoor Championships
Bronze medal – third place	2006 Pattaya	Heptathlon

Pavel Vladimirovich Andreev (Russian: Павел Владимирович Андреев; born November 24, 1978, in Tashkent) is an Uzbekistani decathlete. He is a two-time Olympian and a three-time medalist for the decathlon at the Asian Athletics Championships.

Andreev made his official debut for the 2004 Summer Olympics in Athens, where he did not finish the men's decathlon event for failing to attain a mark in the long jump.

At the 2008 Summer Olympics in Beijing, Andreev competed for the second time in the men's decathlon, along with his compatriot Vitaliy Smirnov. He suffered another setback again for this event, as he pulled himself up in the second heat of the 400 metres, and ultimately, did not finish the race.
