= Qi Haifeng =

Chinese decathlete

Personal information
- Nationality: Chinese
- Born: August 7, 1983 (age 43) Dalian, Liaoning, China
Medal record
Representing China
Asian Games
Gold medal – first place	2002 Busan	Decathlon
Summer Universiade
Bronze medal – third place	2001 Beijing	Decathlon
East Asian Games
Gold medal – first place	2009 Hong Kong	Decathlon

Qi Haifeng (Chinese: 齐海峰; pinyin: Qí Hǎifēng; born August 7, 1983) is a Chinese decathlete. His personal best in decathlon is 8290 points (achieved in May 2005 in Götzis). He won the decathlon at the national championships in 2009 with a points total of 7729.

== Achievements ==
Year	Competition	Venue	Position	Notes
Representing China
2001	Summer Universiade	Beijing, China	3rd	Decathlon
2002	Asian Games	Busan, South Korea	1st	Decathlon
2003	World Championships	Paris, France	7th	Decathlon
2004	Olympic Games	Athens, Greece	18th	Decathlon
2005	Hypo-Meeting	Götzis, Austria	4th	Decathlon
2005	World Championships	Helsinki, Finland	DNF	Decathlon
2008	Olympic Games	Beijing, PR China	18th	Decathlon
