= Kim Kun-woo =

South Korean decathlete (born 1980)

Kim Kun-Woo
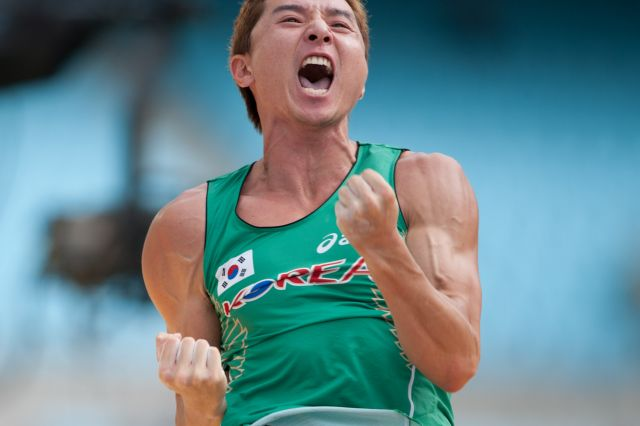

Personal information
- Born: February 29, 1980 (age 46)
Medal record
Men's athletics
Representing South Korea
Asian Games
Silver medal – second place	2010 Guangzhou	Decathlon
Bronze medal – third place	2006 Doha	Decathlon
East Asian Games
Gold medal – first place	2005 Macau	Decathlon
Asian Championships
Silver medal – second place	2000 Jakarta	Decathlon
Silver medal – second place	2005 Incheon	Decathlon

- Kim Kun-woo
- Hangul: 김건우
- RR: Gim Geonu
- MR: Kim Kŏnu

Kim Kun-Woo (Korean: 김건우; born 29 February 1980) is a South Korean track and field athlete who competes in the decathlon. He is a two-time Asian Games medallist in the event (2006 and 2010), as well having won medals at the Asian Athletics Championships and East Asian Games.

Kim represented his country at the 2007 World Championships in Athletics. He is a multiple national champion and holds the South Korean record of 7824 points for the decathlon.

== Career ==
He won his first international medal at the age of twenty, taking the decathlon silver medal behind Hitoshi Maruono at the 2000 Asian Athletics Championships. He won his first national title in the event at the South Korean Championships that year and went on to win five more from 2001 to 2006. He competed at the 2001 Summer Universiade but managed only 15th overall. He improved to eighth place at the following edition – the 2003 Daegu Universiade – and scored a personal best of 7675 points.

Kim set another best at the national championships in 2005, scoring 7774 points. This was followed by strong performances internationally, as he won another continental silver at the 2005 Asian Athletics Championships in Incheon and was just 20 points off his best when he took the gold medal at the 2005 East Asian Games. The 2006 Korean Championships saw him extend his national winning streak to four editions and his score of 7824 points was a career high and a South Korean record. The Asian record holder Dmitriy Karpov was the clear winner at the 2006 Asian Games but Kim won the bronze medal behind Vitaliy Smirnov.

Following a national performance of 7774 points, he attended the 2007 Asian Athletics Championships but failed to match his home form, finishing in fifth place. The 2007 World Championships in Athletics held in Osaka saw Kim make his debut on the global stage. He achieved bests in the pole vault and 110 metres hurdles and finished in 21st place. In spite of his low finishing place, he was the fastest athlete in the field in the final 1500 metres event.

After an almost three-year absence from competition, he returned to action to compete at the 2010 Asian Games. While the 2006 champion Karpov defended his title, Kim managed a score of 7808 points to secure the silver medal – the first time a Korean had achieved the feat in the Asian Games decathlon. During Daegu 2011, he beats the Korean National Record, 7860 points.
