= 2008 in the decathlon =

This page lists the World Best Year Performance in the year 2008 in the men's decathlon. The main event during this season were the 2008 Olympic Games in Beijing, PR China, where the competition was held at the Beijing National Stadium on August 21 and August 22.

== Records ==
Standing records prior to the 2008 season in track and field
World Record	Roman Šebrle (CZE)	9026	May 27, 2001	Götzis, Austria

== 2008 world ranking ==
Rank	Points	Athlete	Venue	Date	Note
1	8832	Bryan Clay (USA)	Eugene, United States	2008-06-30	
2	8585	Andrei Krauchanka (BLR)	Hengelo, Netherlands	2008-06-29	
3	8534	Trey Hardee (USA)	Eugene, United States	2008-06-30	
4	8527	Leonel Suárez (CUB)	Beijing, PR China	2008-08-22	
5	8511	Tom Pappas (USA)	Eugene, United States	2008-06-30	
6	8504	Dmitriy Karpov (KAZ)	Götzis, Austria	2008-06-01	
7	8497	Aleksey Sysoyev (RUS)	Götzis, Austria	2008-06-01	
8	8434	Maurice Smith (JAM)	Kladno, Czech Republic	2008-06-19	
9	8381	Aleksandr Pogorelov (RUS)	Götzis, Austria	2008-06-01	
10	8372	Arthur Abele (GER)	Ratingen, Germany	2008-06-22	
11	8273	André Niklaus (GER)	Ratingen, Germany	2008-06-22	
12	8253	Romain Barras (FRA)	Beijing, PR China	2008-08-22	
13	8248	Michael Schrader (GER)	Ratingen, Germany	2008-06-22	
14	8242	Pascal Behrenbruch (GER)	Götzis, Austria	2008-06-01	
15	8241	Roman Šebrle (CZE)	Beijing, PR China	2008-08-22	
16	8238	Oleksiy Kasyanov (UKR)	Beijing, PR China	2008-08-22	
17	8233	Eugène Martineau (NED)	Ratingen, Germany	2008-06-22	
18	8208	Aleksey Drozdov (RUS)	Götzis, Austria	2008-06-01	
19	8199	Norman Müller (GER)	Manhattan, United States	2008-08-03	
20	8191	Jake Arnold (USA)	Manhattan, United States	2008-08-03	
21	8178	Mikk Pahapill (EST)	Beijing, PR China	2008-08-22	
22	8175	Mustafa Abdur-Rahim (USA)	Manhattan, United States	2008-08-03	
23	8143	Chris Helwick (USA)	Manhattan, United States	2008-08-03	
24	8142	Frédéric Xhonneux (BEL)	Desenzano del Garda, Italy	2008-05-11	
25	8122	Ashton Eaton (USA)	Eugene, United States	2008-06-30	

== See also ==
- 2008 Décastar
- 2008 Hypo-Meeting
