= 2006 in the decathlon =

This page lists the World Best Year Performance in the year 2006 for the men's decathlon. The main event during this season was the 2006 European Championships in Gothenburg, Sweden. The competition started on 10 August and ended on 11 August. The main stadium for this 19th championship was the Stadium Ullevi.

== Records ==
Standing records prior to the 2006 season in track and field
World Record	Roman Šebrle (CZE)	9026	May 27, 2001	Götzis, Austria

== 2006 World Year Ranking ==
Rank	Points	Athlete	Venue	Date	Note
1	8677	Bryan Clay (USA)	Götzis, Austria	2006-05-28	
2	8526	Roman Šebrle (CZE)	Göteborg, Sweden	2006-08-11	
3	8465	Trey Hardee (USA)	Austin, United States	2006-04-06	
4	8438	Dmitriy Karpov (KAZ)	Talence, France	2006-09-17	
5	8390	Attila Zsivoczky (HUN)	Arles, France	2006-07-02	
6	8350	Aleksey Drozdov (RUS)	Göteborg, Sweden	2006-08-11	
7	8349	Maurice Smith (JAM)	Ratingen, Germany	2006-06-25	
8	8319	Tom Pappas (USA)	Indianapolis, United States	2006-06-24	
9	8310	Dennis Leyckes (GER)	Ratingen, Germany	2006-06-25	
10	8245	Aleksandr Pogorelov (RUS)	Göteborg, Sweden	2006-08-11	
11	8239	André Niklaus (GER)	Götzis, Austria	2006-05-28	
12	8209	Pascal Behrenbruch (GER)	Göteborg, Sweden	2006-08-11	
13	8143	Dean Macey (GBR)	Melbourne, Australia	2006-03-21	
14	8138	Romain Barras (FRA)	Götzis, Austria	2006-05-28	
15	8136	Aliaksandr Parkhomenka (BLR)	Göteborg, Sweden	2006-08-11	
16	8129	Norman Müller (GER)	Ratingen, Germany	2006-06-25	
17	8108	Alexey Sysoev (RUS)	Götzis, Austria	2006-05-28	
18	8083	Kristjan Rahnu (EST)	Göteborg, Sweden	2006-08-11	
19	8035	Eugène Martineau (NED)	Göteborg, Sweden	2006-08-11	
20	8022	Ryan Harlan (USA)	Talence, France	2006-09-17	
21	8013	Andrei Krauchanka (BLR)	Götzis, Austria	2006-05-28	
22	8012	Arthur Abele (GER)	Bernhausen, Germany	2006-05-28	
23	8002	Mikk Pahapill (EST)	Götzis, Austria	2006-05-28	
24	8001	Jason Dudley (AUS)	Melbourne, Australia	2006-03-21	
25	7997	Tomáš Dvořák (CZE)	Göteborg, Sweden	2006-08-11	

== See also ==
- 2006 Décastar
- 2006 Hypo-Meeting
