= 2008 IAAF World Indoor Championships – Men's heptathlon =

== Medalists ==
Gold
Bryan Clay	United States
Silver
Andrei Krauchanka	Belarus
Bronze
Dmitriy Karpov	Kazakhstan

== 60 metres ==
Pos	Lane	Name	Country	Mark	React	Points
1	2	Bryan Clay	United States	6.71 SB	0.152	988
2	8	Andres Raja	Estonia	6.95 PB	0.149	900
3	7	Donovan Kilmartin	United States	7.02 PB	0.166	875
4	3	Mikhail Logvinenko	Russia	7.03 PB	0.139	872
5	6	Aleksandr Pogorelov	Russia	7.06 SB	0.167	861
6	1	Roman Šebrle	Czech Republic	7.16	0.245	826
7	5	Andrei Krauchanka	Belarus	7.19	0.301	816
8	4	Dmitriy Karpov	Kazakhstan	7.20	0.259	813

== Long Jump ==
Pos	Name	Country	Mark	Attempts			Points
Pos	Name	Country	Mark	1	2	3	Points
1	Bryan Clay	United States	7.75 SB	7.56	7.75	X	997
2	Andrei Krauchanka	Belarus	7.63	7.44	7.63	7.44	967
3	Roman Šebrle	Czech Republic	7.60 SB	7.51	7.49	7.60	960
4	Aleksandr Pogorelov	Russia	7.48	7.48	7.16	-	930
5	Andres Raja	Estonia	7.42 PB	7.14	7.42	X	915
6	Donovan Kilmartin	United States	7.36 SB	7.36	7.33	7.13	900
7	Mikhail Logvinenko	Russia	7.35	X	7.21	7.35	898
8	Dmitriy Karpov	Kazakhstan	7.31 SB	7.17	7.31	7.30	888

== Shot Put ==
Pos	Name	Country	Mark	Attempts			Points
Pos	Name	Country	Mark	1	2	3	Points
1	Bryan Clay	United States	16.21 PB	16.12	15.78	16.21	864
2	Dmitriy Karpov	Kazakhstan	16.19	16.04	X	16.19	863
3	Roman Šebrle	Czech Republic	16.16 SB	15.21	15.25	16.16	861
4	Andres Raja	Estonia	14.86 PB	13.62	X	14.86	781
5	Andrei Krauchanka	Belarus	14.29 PB	14.05	14.29	X	746
6	Donovan Kilmartin	United States	14.09 SB	14.05	14.09	X	734
7	Mikhail Logvinenko	Russia	13.82	12.83	13.82	X	717
	Aleksandr Pogorelov	Russia	DNS				

== High Jump ==
Pos	Name	Country	Mark	Attempts												Points
Pos	Name	Country	Mark	1.85	1.88	1.91	1.94	1.97	2.00	2.03	2.06	2.09	2.12	2.15	2.18	Points
1	Andrei Krauchanka	Belarus	2.15	-	-	-	-	-	O	-	O	-	XXO	XXO	XXX	944
2	Roman Šebrle	Czech Republic	2.12 SB	-	-	-	O	-	XO	-	O	XO	O	XXX		915
3	Bryan Clay	United States	2.09 SB	-	-	-	O	-	O	XXO	XO	XXO	XXX			915
4	Dmitriy Karpov	Kazakhstan	2.06	-	-	-	XXO	O	XO	O	O	XXX				859
5	Donovan Kilmartin	United States	2.03 SB	-	-	O	-	XO	O	XO	XXX					831
6	Mikhail Logvinenko	Russia	2.00 PB	O	-	O	XXO	XO	O	XXX						803
7	Andres Raja	Estonia	1.97	O	-	O	O	O	XXX							776
	Aleksandr Pogorelov	Russia	DNS													

== 60 metres Hurdles ==
Pos	Lane	Name	Country	Mark	React	Points
1	4	Bryan Clay	United States	7.86 SB	0.179	1017
2	8	Andres Raja	Estonia	8.03	0.220	974
3	7	Mikhail Logvinenko	Russia	8.08	0.251	962
4	6	Andrei Krauchanka	Belarus	8.11	0.259	954
5	5	Dmitriy Karpov	Kazakhstan	8.15	0.158	944
6	2	Donovan Kilmartin	United States	8.25 SB	0.205	920
	3	Roman Šebrle	Czech Republic	DNF	0.212	

== Pole Vault ==
Pos	Name	Country	Mark	Attempts											Points
Pos	Name	Country	Mark	4.40	4.50	4.60	4.70	4.80	4.90	5.00	5.10	5.20	5.30	5.40	Points
1	Andrei Krauchanka	Belarus	5.30 PB	-	-	O	-	O	O	O	O	O	O	XXX	1004
2	Dmitriy Karpov	Kazakhstan	5.20 PB	-	-	O	-	XXO	-	XXO	XO	O	XXX		972
3	Donovan Kilmartin	United States	5.10 SB	-	-	-	-	-	XO	O	O	XXX			941
4	Bryan Clay	United States	5.00	-	-	O	-	O	XXO	O	XXX				910
5	Mikhail Logvinenko	Russia	5.00 PB	-	-	O	-	O	-	XO	XXX				910
6	Andres Raja	Estonia	4.60	O	-	O	XXX								790
	Roman Šebrle	Czech Republic	DNS												

== 1,000 metres ==
Pos	Name	Country	Mark	Points
1	Mikhail Logvinenko	Russia	2:44.69	822
2	Andrei Krauchanka	Belarus	2:46.49	803
3	Dmitriy Karpov	Kazakhstan	2:47.45	792
4	Andres Raja	Estonia	2.50.76	758
5	Donovan Kilmartin	United States	2:51.54 PB	750
6	Bryan Clay	United States	2:55.64 SB	708

== Summary ==
Pos	Name	Country	Total	60m	LJ	SP	HJ	60mH	PV	1000m
Gold medal	Bryan Clay	United States	6371 WL	988	997	864	887	1017	910	708
Silver medal	Andrei Krauchanka	Belarus	6234 NR	816	967	746	944	954	1004	803
Bronze medal	Dmitriy Karpov	Kazakhstan	6131	813	888	863	859	944	972	792
4	Mikhail Logvinenko	Russia	5984	872	898	717	803	962	910	822
5	Donovan Kilmartin	United States	5951	875	900	734	831	920	941	750
6	Andres Raja	Estonia	5894	900	915	781	776	974	790	758
	Roman Šebrle	Czech Republic	DNF	826	960	861	915	0		
	Aleksandr Pogorelov	Russia	DNF	861	930					
