= 2005 in the decathlon =

This page lists the World Best Year Performance in the year 2005 in the men's decathlon. The main event during this season were the 2005 World Championships in Helsinki, Finland, where the competition started on Tuesday August 9, 2005 and ended on Wednesday August 10, 2005 in the Helsinki Olympic Stadium.

== Records ==
Standing records prior to the 2005 season in track and field
World Record	Roman Šebrle (CZE)	9026	May 27, 2001	Götzis, Austria

== 2005 World Year Ranking ==
Rank	Points	Athlete	Venue	Date	Note
1	8732	Bryan Clay (USA)	Helsinki, Finland	2005-08-10	
2	8534	Roman Šebrle (CZE)	Götzis, Austria	2005-05-29	
3	8526	Kristjan Rahnu (EST)	Arles, France	2005-06-05	
4	8480	Attila Zsivoczky (HUN)	Götzis, Austria	2005-05-29	
5	8429	Aleksandr Pogorelov (RUS)	Götzis, Austria	2005-05-29	
6	8316	André Niklaus (GER)	Helsinki, Finland	2005-08-10	
7	8290	Qi Haifeng (CHN)	Götzis, Austria	2005-05-29	
8	8232	Maurice Smith (JAM)	San Juan, Puerto Rico	2005-05-29	
9	8196	Aleksey Drozdov (RUS)	Erfurt, Germany	2005-07-15	
10	8185	Romain Barras (FRA)	Götzis, Austria	2005-05-29	
11	8149	Mikk Pahapill (EST)	Bydgoszcz, Poland	2005-07-03	
12	8114	Eugène Martineau (NED)	Götzis, Austria	2005-05-29	
13	8107	Phillip McMullen (USA)	Salo, Finland	2005-05-08	
14	8105	Tomáš Dvořák (CZE)	Jyväskylä, Finland	2005-07-03	
15	8090	Alexey Sysoev (RUS)	Sochi, Russia	2005-05-18	
16	8051	Aliaksandr Parkhomenka (BLR)	Izmir, Turkey	2005-08-19	
17	8042	Jaakko Ojaniemi (FIN)	Helsinki, Finland	2005-08-10	
18	8025	Rudy Bourguignon (FRA)	Talence, France	2005-09-18	
19	8023	Hamdi Dhouibi (TUN)	Helsinki, Finland	2005-08-10	
20	7997	Ryan Harlan (USA)	San Juan, Puerto Rico	2005-05-29	
21	7989	Norman Müller (GER)	Erfurt, Germany	2005-07-15	
22	7976	Paul Terek (USA)	Carson, United States	2005-06-24	
23	7975	Roland Schwarzl (AUT)	Götzis, Austria	2005-05-29	
24	7950	François Gourmet (BEL)	Talence, France	2005-09-18	
25	7920	Lars Albert (GER)	Götzis, Austria	2005-05-29	

== See also ==
- 2005 Décastar
- 2005 Hypo-Meeting
