= 2005 Hypo-Meeting =

The 31st edition of the annual Hypo-Meeting took place on 28 May and 29 May 2005 in Götzis, Austria. The track and field competition, featuring a decathlon (men) and a heptathlon (women) event, was part of the 2005 IAAF World Combined Events Challenge.

== Men's decathlon ==
=== Schedule ===
28 May
1. 100 m
2. Long jump
3. Shot put
4. High jump
5. 400 m

29 May
6. 110 m hurdles
7. Discus throw
8. Pole vault
9. Javelin throw
10. 1,500 m

=== Records ===
World record	Roman Šebrle (CZE)	9026	27 May 2001	Götzis, Austria
Event record	Roman Šebrle (CZE)	9026	27 May 2001	Götzis, Austria

=== Results ===
Rank	Athlete	Decathlon										Points
Rank	Athlete	1	2	3	4	5	6	7	8	9	10	Points
1	Roman Šebrle (CZE)	11,06	7.85	15.36	2.06	49,17	14,50	47.77	4.80	66.57	4.33,74	8534
2	Attila Zsivoczky (HUN)	10,90	7.15	15.96	2.15	49,46	14,63	47.90	4.90	62.79	4.31,89	8480
3	Aleksandr Pogorelov (RUS)	10,91	7.64	16.03	2.09	50,16	14,14	48.44	5.10	58.23	4.55,90	8429
4	Qi Haifeng (CHN)	10,87	7.40	13.41	2.03	48,72	14,63	48.57	4.70	64.53	4.32,02	8290
5	Romain Barras (FRA)	11,32	7.26	14.54	2.00	49,24	14,44	43.95	4.90	65.84	4.31,52	8185
6	Eugène Martineau (NED)	10,96	7.39	13.80	2.03	49,25	15,01	41.89	5.00	61.82	4.34,69	8114
7	André Niklaus (GER)	11,06	7.35	14.14	2.03	49,37	14,61	42.36	4.80	59.92	4.33,58	8074
8	Roland Schwarzl (AUT)	11,09	7.44	14.48	1.97	50,28	14,70	46.15	4.80	54.71	4.37,96	7975
9	Bryan Clay (USA)	10,51	5.54	15.20	2.00	48,52	13,94	49.88	4.90	67.02	5.22,82	7961
10	Lars Albert (GER)	11,05	7.53	15.36	1.94	51,81	15,12	45.71	4.70	63.70	4.52,36	7920
11	Norman Müller (GER)	10,97	7.30	14.71	2.03	49,98	14,69	38.93	4.60	57.18	4.39,06	7874
12	Chiel Warners (NED)	10,96	7.61	14.03	1.94	48,46	14,55	41.00	4.60	52.12	4.46,77	7836
13	Andrei Krauchanka (BLR)	11,06	7.57	12.96	2.15	49,43	14,59	33.50	4.20	58.26	4.26,89	7833
14	Anders Black (DEN)	11,25	7.46	14.12	2.15	50,84	15,32	40.20	4.10	57.92	4.39,05	7705
15	Christopher Hallmann (GER)	10,81	7.15	12.82	1.91	49,11	15,03	39.15	4.70	54.55	4.35,15	7667
16	Madis Kallas (EST)	11,14	7.28	14.56	2.00	52,02	15,36	45.37	4.60	53.81	4.58,08	7588
17	William Frullani (ITA)	11,00	7.45	14.05	2.09	51,23	15,01	43.92	4.50	49.15	5.18,49	7547
18	David Gervasi (SUI)	11,30	7.17	13.60	1.97	51,25	14,73	38.57	4.60	54.15	4.41,00	7519
19	Johannes Künz (AUT)	11,36	6.82	11.82	1.82	49,58	15,28	41.51	4.10	46.19	4.20,76	7120
20	Prodromos Korkizoglou (GRE)	11.01	6.85	14.43	1.91	51.77	15.24	40.62	4.50	50.99	DNF	6710
—	Tomáš Dvořák (CZE)	11.03	7.23	15.31	—	—	—	—	—	—	—	DNF
—	David Gómez (ESP)	11.31	6.94	13.36	1.88	49.88	—	—	—	—	—	DNF
—	Zsolt Kürtösi (HUN)	DNF	—	—	—	—	—	—	—	—	—	DNF
—	Dennis Leyckes (GER)	10.93	7.14	13.56	—	—	—	—	—	—	—	DNF
—	Jiří Ryba (CZE)	11.54	6.79	12.71	1.91	—	—	—	—	—	—	DNF

== Women's heptathlon ==
=== Schedule ===
28 May
1. 100 m hurdles
2. High jump
3. Shot put
4. 200 m

29 May
5. Long jump
6. Javelin throw
7. 800 m

=== Records ===
World record	Jackie Joyner-Kersee (USA)	7291	24 September 1988	Seoul, South Korea
Event record	Sabine Braun (GER)	6985	31 May 1992	Götzis, Austria

=== Results ===
Rank	Athlete	Heptathlon							Points
Rank	Athlete	1	2	3	4	5	6	7	Points
1	Carolina Klüft (SWE)	13.15	1.94	13.33	23.34	6.68	44.08	2:10.46	6824
2	Kelly Sotherton (GBR)	13.27	1.85	13.84	23.77	6.67	37.21	2:10.29	6547
3	Hyleas Fountain (USA)	13.09	1.88	12.13	23.87	6.67	46.90	2:22.81	6502
4	Margaret Simpson (GHA)	13.41	1.85	13.01	24.55	6.32	52.71	2:21.71	6423
5	Austra Skujytė (LTU)	14.16	1.82	16.92	25.22	6.12	48.79	2:18.32	6386
6	Karin Ruckstuhl (NED)	13.38	1.76	13.55	24.27	6.34	43.61	2:13.76	6318
7	Nataliya Dobrynska (UKR)	13.95	1.82	15.34	24.95	6.35	43.52	2:18.63	6299
8	Sonja Kesselschläger (GER)	13.47	1.79	12.99	24.94	6.22	44.35	2:13.63	6221
9	Laurien Hoos (NED)	13.58	1.76	15.22	23.97	5.78	50.22	2:26.29	6214
10	Lilli Schwarzkopf (GER)	13.98	1.82	13.08	25.42	5.90	47.61	2:11.22	6146
11	Jessica Zelinka (CAN)	13.42	1.70	13.41	24.49	6.14	42.74	2:13.20	6137
12	Katja Keller (GER)	13.38	1.79	13.06	24.78	6.10	41.41	2:15.64	6130
13	Simone Oberer (SUI)	13.76	1.82	12.08	25.03	6.25	38.85	2:13.47	6052
14	Claudia Tonn (GER)	13.90	1.79	12.58	24.55	6.15	37.03	2:10.89	6046
15	Marie Collonvillé (FRA)	13.72	1.79	12.45	25.09	6.05	42.20	2:14.96	6022
16	Julie Hollman (GBR)	14.15	1.79	11.93	24.92	6.38	39.35	2:16.15	5974
17	Gertrud Bacher (ITA)	14.32	1.70	13.43	25.30	5.77	46.26	2:12.96	5894
18	Vasilikí Delinikóla (GRE)	13.65	1.73	10.98	25.00	6.19	44.02	2:36.00	5673
19	Argiro Strataki (GRE)	13.80	1.76	12.69	24.89	NM	42.24	2:19.18	5084
—	Sylvie Dufour (SUI)	14.04	1.64	12.78	25.47	5.57	—	—	DNF
—	Fiona Harrison (GBR)	DNF	1.73	12.49	—	—	—	—	DNF

== See also ==
- 2005 World Championships in Athletics – Men's decathlon
- Athletics at the 2005 Summer Universiade – Men's decathlon
- 2005 World Championships in Athletics – Women's heptathlon
- 2005 Décastar
- 2005 Decathlon Year Ranking
