= Athletics at the 2005 Summer Universiade – Men's decathlon =

The men's decathlon competition at the 2005 Summer Universiade took place on 18 August and 19 August 2005 in the İzmir Atatürk Stadyumu in İzmir, Turkey.

== Medalists ==
Gold	Aliaksandr Parkhomenka; Belarus (BLR)
Silver	François Gourmet; Belgium (BEL)
Bronze	Nadir El Fassi; France (FRA)

== Records ==
World record	Roman Šebrle (CZE)	9026	27 May 2001	Götzis, Austria
Universiade record	Roman Šebrle (CZE)	8380	30 August 1997	Catania, Italy

== Results ==
The highest mark recorded in each event is highlighted in yellow

Rank	Athlete	Nationality	100m	LJ	SP	HJ	400m	110m H	DT	PV	JT	1500m	Points
1st place, gold medalist(s)	Aliaksandr Parkhomenka	Belarus	11.26	7.14	15.98	2.01	50.32	14.92	40.94	4.80	63.75	4:28.99	8051
2nd place, silver medalist(s)	François Gourmet	Belgium	10.64	7.13	13.80	1.92	47.65	15.31	35.08	4.90	52.51	4:29.27	7792
3rd place, bronze medalist(s)	Nadir El Fassi	France	11.22	7.16	13.13	2.01	50.59	14.93	39.23	4.60	56.24	4:20.76	7724
4	Madis Kallas	Estonia	11.24	6.97	14.35	2.01	51.65	15.10	45.58	4.70	54.37	4:46.93	7644
5	Lassi Raunio	Finland	10.98	6.99	13.42	1.98	50.05	14.57	43.20	4.30	58.98	5:07.50	7540
6	Clifford Caines	Canada	11.27	6.78	13.08	2.04	50.06	15.50	39.31	4.10	51.89	4:28.75	7343
7	Mihail Papaioannou	Greece	11.02	7.01	13.16	1.95	51.53	14.88	40.49	4.20	51.01	4:51.16	7280
8	Paolo Mottadelli	Italy	11.07	6.87	13.56	1.80	49.93	14.80	41.64	4.50	54.94	5:08.92	7277
9	Ali Hazer	Lebanon	11.40	5.98	9.94	1.77	49.79	16.11	32.14	NM	41.62	4:59.35	5520
	Carlos Paterson	Cuba	10.96	7.32	12.64	1.86	50.22	14.90	DNS	–	–	–	DNF
	Lars Albert	Germany	11.26	7.02	15.81	1.89	DNS	–	–	–	–	–	DNF
	Steven Marrero	Puerto Rico	11.76	6.57	12.27	DNS	–	–	–	–	–	–	DNF
	Runar Heltne	Norway	11.28	6.41	DNS	–	–	–	–	–	–	–	DNF

== See also ==
- 2005 World Championships in Athletics – Men's decathlon
- 2005 Hypo-Meeting
- 2005 Décastar
- 2005 Decathlon Year Ranking
