= 2010 IAAF World Indoor Championships – Men's heptathlon =

The men's heptathlon at the 2010 IAAF World Indoor Championships was held at the ASPIRE Dome on 12 and 13 March.

== Medalists ==
Gold	Silver	Bronze
Bryan Clay; United States	Trey Hardee; United States	Aleksey Drozdov; Russia

== Records ==
Standing records prior to the 2010 IAAF World Indoor Championships
World record	Dan O'Brien (USA)	6476	Toronto, Canada	14 March 1993
Championship record	Dan O'Brien (USA)	6476	Toronto, Canada	14 March 1993
World Leading	Aleksey Drozdov (RUS)	6300	Penza, Russia	3 February 2010
African record	Larbi Bouraada (ALG)	5911	Paris, France	28 February 2010
Asian record	Dmitriy Karpov (KAZ)	6229	Tallinn, Estonia	16 February 2008
European record	Roman Šebrle (CZE)	6438	Budapest, Hungary	7 March 2004
North and Central American and Caribbean record	Dan O'Brien (USA)	6476	Toronto, Canada	14 March 1993
Oceanian Record	Harold Nair (FIJ)	3498	Houston, United States	2 February 2008
South American record	Gonzalo Barroilhet (CHI)	5951	Fayetteville, United States	15 March 2008

== Qualification standards ==
Eight (8) athletes will be invited by the IAAF in the Heptathlon and in the Pentathlon as follows:

1. the three best athletes from the 2009 Outdoor Lists (as at 31 December 2009) limited to a maximum of one per country and
2. the three best athletes from the 2010 Indoor Lists (as at 22 February 2010)
3. two athletes which may be invited at the discretion of the IAAF

In total no more than two male and two female athletes from any one Member will be invited. Upon refusals or cancellations, the invitations shall be extended to the next ranked athletes in the same lists respecting the above conditions. Members whose athletes are invited as above will receive additional quota places accordingly

== Schedule ==
Date	Time	Round
March 12, 2010	10:15	60 metres
March 12, 2010	10:50	Long jump
March 12, 2010	16:35	Shot put
March 12, 2010	17:30	High jump
March 13, 2010	9:15	60 metres hurdles
March 13, 2010	10:40	Pole vault
March 13, 2010	16:40	1000 metres
March 13, 2010	16:40	Final standings

== Results ==
=== 60 metres ===
Rank	Name	Nationality	Time	Points	Notes
1	Bryan Clay	United States	6.67	1003	SB
2	Trey Hardee	United States	6.80	955	SB
3	Oleksiy Kasyanov	Ukraine	6.93	907	
4	Aleksey Drozdov	Russia	7.08	854	SB
5	Leonel Suárez	Cuba	7.15	830	
6	Roman Šebrle	Czech Republic	7.20	813	SB
7	Andrei Krauchanka	Belarus	7.22	806	
8	Aleksandr Pogorelov	Russia	7.68	656	SB

=== Long jump ===
Rank	Name	Nationality	Result	Points	Notes
1	Oleksiy Kasyanov	Ukraine	7.78	1005	
2	Roman Šebrle	Czech Republic	7.49	932	SB
3	Andrei Krauchanka	Belarus	7.38	905	
4	Aleksey Drozdov	Russia	7.29	883	
5	Trey Hardee	United States	7.28	881	
6	Bryan Clay	United States	7.27	878	
7	Leonel Suárez	Cuba	7.12	842	
	Aleksandr Pogorelov	Russia	DNS		

=== Shot put ===
Rank	Name	Nationality	Result	Points	Notes
1	Aleksey Drozdov	Russia	17.17	924	PB
2	Roman Šebrle	Czech Republic	15.70	833	SB
3	Bryan Clay	United States	15.31	809	SB
4	Oleksiy Kasyanov	Ukraine	14.55	762	
5	Trey Hardee	United States	14.54	761	
6	Andrei Krauchanka	Belarus	13.59	703	
7	Leonel Suárez	Cuba	13.59	703	
	Aleksandr Pogorelov	Russia	DNS		

=== High jump ===
Rank	Name	Nationality	Result	Points	Notes
1	Andrei Krauchanka	Belarus	2.18	973	SB
2	Aleksey Drozdov	Russia	2.09	887	
3	Roman Šebrle	Czech Republic	2.09	887	SB
4	Trey Hardee	United States	2.06	859	PB
5	Leonel Suárez	Cuba	2.06	859	SB
6	Bryan Clay	United States	2.06	859	SB
7	Oleksiy Kasyanov	Ukraine	2.00	803	
	Aleksandr Pogorelov	Russia	DNS		

=== 60 metres hurdles ===
Rank	Name	Nationality	Time	Points	Notes
1	Trey Hardee	United States	7.79	1035	
2	Bryan Clay	United States	8.00	982	
3	Oleksiy Kasyanov	Ukraine	8.01	979	SB
4	Andrei Krauchanka	Belarus	8.04	972	
5	Leonel Suárez	Cuba	8.24	922	
6	Roman Šebrle	Czech Republic	8.30	908	
7	Aleksey Drozdov	Russia	8.34	898	

=== Pole vault ===
Rank	Name	Nationality	Result	Points	Notes
1	Andrei Krauchanka	Belarus	5.00	910	
2	Bryan Clay	United States	5.00	910	SB
3	Trey Hardee	United States	5.00	910	SB
4	Aleksey Drozdov	Russia	4.90	880	
5	Roman Šebrle	Czech Republic	4.80	849	SB
6	Leonel Suárez	Cuba	4.60	790	
7	Oleksiy Kasyanov	Ukraine	4.40	731	

=== 1000 metres ===
Rank	Name	Nationality	Time	Points	Notes
1	Andrei Krauchanka	Belarus	2:41.70	855	SB
2	Oleksiy Kasyanov	Ukraine	2:43.78	832	
3	Leonel Suárez	Cuba	2:45.04	818	
4	Aleksey Drozdov	Russia	2:45.35	815	SB
5	Roman Šebrle	Czech Republic	2:46.55	802	SB
6	Trey Hardee	United States	2:47.76	789	PB
7	Bryan Clay	United States	2:50.28	763	SB

=== Final standings ===
Rank	Name	Nationality	Points	Notes
Gold medal	Bryan Clay	United States	6204	SB
Silver medal	Trey Hardee	United States	6184	SB
Bronze medal	Aleksey Drozdov	Russia	6141	
4	Andrei Krauchanka	Belarus	6124	
5	Roman Šebrle	Czech Republic	6024	SB
6	Oleksiy Kasyanov	Ukraine	6019	
7	Leonel Suárez	Cuba	5764	
	Aleksandr Pogorelov	Russia	DNF	
