= Andrei Krauchanka =

Belarusian decathlete (born 1986)

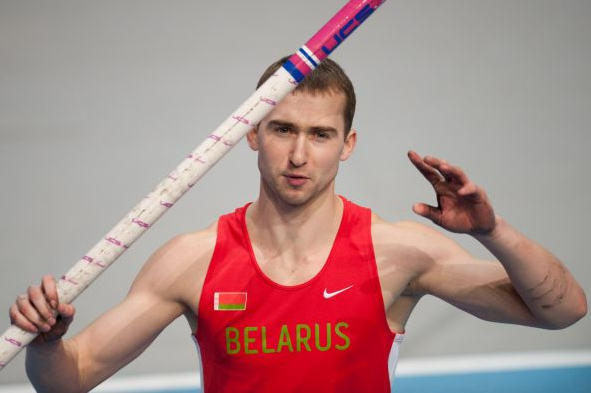
- Krauchanka in Paris (2011)

Personal information
- Full name: Andrei Sergeyevich Krauchanka
- Nationality: Belarus
- Born: January 4, 1986 (age 40) Myshanka, Gomel Region, Belarus
- Height: 1.92 m (6 ft 4 in)
- Weight: 82 kg (181 lb)

Sport
- Sport: Track and Field
- Events: Decathlon, Heptathlon

Achievements and titles
- Personal bests: Decathlon: 8,617 (2007); Heptathlon: 6,303 (2014)
Medal record
Representing Belarus
Men's athletics
Olympic Games
| Silver medal – second place | 2008 Beijing | Decathlon |
World Indoor Championships
| Silver medal – second place | 2008 Valencia | Heptathlon |
| Silver medal – second place | 2014 Sopot | Heptathlon |
European Championships
| Gold medal – first place | 2014 Zürich | Decathlon |
| Bronze medal – third place | 2010 Barcelona | Decathlon |
European Indoor Championships
| Gold medal – first place | 2011 Paris | Heptathlon |
| Bronze medal – third place | 2007 Birmingham | Heptathlon |
World Youth Championships
| Silver medal – second place | 2003 Sherbrooke | Octathlon |

Andrei Sergeyevich Krauchanka (Belarusian: Андрэй Сяргеевіч Краўчанка; also transliterated as Andrey Kravchenko) (born 4 January 1986) is a Belarusian decathlete. He was the silver medallist at the 2008 Beijing Olympics. His personal best score of 8617 points is the Belarusian record for the event. He also holds the national indoor record in the heptathlon with 6282 points.

Krauchanka was a talented combined events athlete from a young age: he broke the world youth best for the octathlon and was runner-up at the 2003 World Youth Championships in Athletics. He became the European and World Junior champion in the decathlon before emerging as a senior in 2007, when he won the bronze medal at the 2007 European Athletics Indoor Championships and set his best of 8617 to win the Hypo-Meeting.

Two silver medals on the global stage came in 2008, first at the 2008 IAAF World Indoor Championships and then at the Olympics in Beijing. Injuries affected his performances from 2009 to 2012, although he won bronze at the 2010 European Athletics Championships and gold at the 2011 European Athletics Indoor Championships during that time.

== Career ==
=== Early career ===
Born in Myshanka in the Gomel Region, he grew up in the town of Pyetrykaw. Both his parents were involved in sports: his father Sergey was the military champion in combined track and field events when he was part of the Soviet Air Defence Forces, while his mother took part in figure skating, volleyball and athletics. His parents broke up when he was aged nine and, enduring financial difficulty, his mother encouraged him to take up athletics as a distraction. He performed to a high standard and went to the Olympic sports boarding school in Gomel as a teenager.

In 2000, he won the Belarusian youth title in the octathlon. International competitions followed and he broke the world youth record in the octathlon with a total of 6415 points in 2003. This mark was beaten soon after by Andrés Silva, who won at the 2003 World Youth Championships in Athletics, leaving Krauchanka with the silver medal. He also placed fifth in the long jump at that year's European Youth Olympic Festival. That year a period of training in Finland under Pavel Hamalainen, father of Eduard Hämäläinen, did not last and he returned to his original coach Ivan Gordienko.

Krauchanka moved into decathlon competitions in 2004 and, after setting a best of 7963 points to win the national junior title, he broke the championship record at the 2004 World Junior Championships in Athletics, collecting 8126 points with a series of personal bests. He broke the national junior record in heptathlon at 2005's Tallinn combined events meeting with 5929 points. He placed 13th at the high-profile 2005 Hypo-Meeting before winning his second major junior title at the 2005 European Athletics Junior Championships. In 2006, he again broke the 8000-point barrier, coming eleventh at the 2006 Hypo-Meeting, and placed third at the European Cup Combined Events.

=== First Olympic medal ===
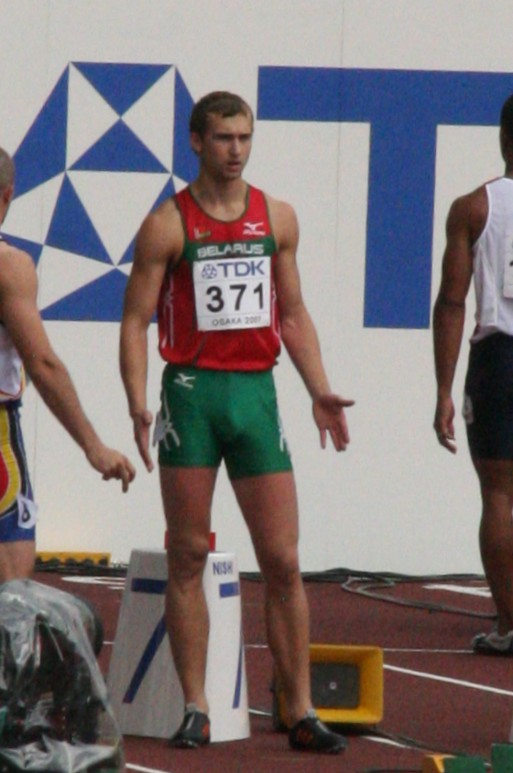
Krauchanka before being disqualified on his global debut at the 2007 World Championships

Krauchanka set a personal heptathlon best at the Tallinn meet (5955) then won his first ever senior medal in the event at the 2007 European Athletics Indoor Championships, earning 6090 points and a bronze medal. The outdoor season saw him make a significant breakthrough as he won the 2007 Hypo-Meeting with a personal best of 8617 points. Among his competitors, he defeated the world record holder Roman Sebrle and reigning world champion Bryan Clay, both of whom praised the emerging Belarusian. He set personal bests in seven of the disciplines and was the outright winner in four of them. He failed to finish at the TNT – Fortuna Meeting but solidified his progress with a win at the 2007 European Athletics U23 Championships with 8492 points. The pressure of expectation affected him at the 2007 World Championships in Athletics as in the first 100 metres event he obviously false started twice, eliminating himself from the competition. He ended the year on a high note with a win at the Décastar meet.

The 2008 season started well for him with a Belarusian record in the heptathlon in Tallinn, winning the competition with a score of points. He bettered this with 6234 points at the 2008 IAAF World Indoor Championships, taking the silver medal behind Bryan Clay. Heading into the outdoor season he was more conservative in entering competitions and won the European Cup decathlon with 8585 points before going on to claim the silver medal in the event at the 2008 Beijing Olympics (again behind Clay). He retained his Décastar title in his last decathlon of the season and was the series winner of the IAAF Combined Events Challenge.

=== European medals ===
In spite of his successful 2008 season, he was unable to progress further in 2009 as he caught pneumonia and suffered throughout the season. He won the European Cup Combined Events title and placed tenth at the 2009 World Championships in Athletics, but his season's best of 8336 points was somewhat lower than the previous two years.

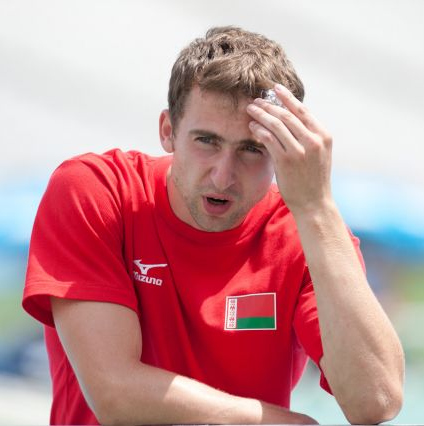
Krauchanka at the 2010 European Athletics Championships, where his pole snapped mid-competition

In 2010, he won the national universities title with a score of 6206 points for the heptathlon and went on the place fourth at the 2010 IAAF World Indoor Championships. Another major medal came at the 2010 European Athletics Championships, where his score of 8370 was enough for the decathlon bronze medal. At that competition, he looked set to be eliminated during the pole vault as his pole snapped mid-event. However, a Lithuanian rival Darius Draudvila allowed Krauchanka to borrow his implement, allowing the Belarusian to continue. The Belarusian team nominated Draudvila for the World Fair Play Award for his sportsmanship.

Krauchanka won another continental medal at the 2011 European Athletics Indoor Championships, improving his own national record to 6282 points to win the competition. However, he was carrying an ankle injury and was in pain during the events. He failed to finish at that year's TNT – Fortuna Meeting and missed the 2011 World Championships in Athletics. He was fifth at the Decastar in September. He performed well at the 2012 Belarusian indoor championships, becoming champion with 6205 points, but managed only sixth at the 2012 IAAF World Indoor Championships then failed to complete the decathlon at the Hypo-Meeting in May. This was his first and final outdoor appearance that year. His next competition came almost one year later, at the Multistars meeting, and he demonstrated a return to fitness with a winning score of 8390 points.

== Competition record ==
| Year | Competition | Venue | Position | Event | Notes |
|---|---|---|---|---|---|
| 2003 | European Youth Olympic Festival | Paris | 5th | Long jump | 7.19 m |
| 2003 | World Youth Championships | Sherbrooke | 2nd | Octathlon | 6366 pts |
| 2004 | World Junior Championships | Grosseto | 1st | Decathlon (junior implements) | 8126 pts |
| 2005 | Hypo-Meeting | Götzis | 13th | Decathlon | 7833 pts |
| 2005 | European Junior Championships | Kaunas | 1st | Decathlon (junior implements) | 7997 pts |
| 2006 | Hypo-Meeting | Götzis | 11th | Decathlon | 8013 pts |
| 2006 | European Cup Combined Events (1st league) | Yalta | 3rd | Decathlon | 7805 pts |
| 2007 | European Indoor Championships | Birmingham | 3rd | Heptathlon | 6090 pts PBi |
| 2007 | Hypo-Meeting | Götzis | 1st | Decathlon | 8617 pts PB |
| 2007 | European U23 Championships | Debrecen | 1st | Decathlon | 8492 pts |
| 2007 | World Championships | Osaka | — | Decathlon | DNF |
| 2008 | World Indoor Championships | Valencia | 2nd | Heptathlon | 6234 pts PBi |
| 2008 | European Cup Combined Events (Super league) | Hengelo | 1st | Decathlon | 8585 pts |
| 2008 | Olympic Games | Beijing | 2nd | Decathlon | 8551 pts |
| 2009 | European Cup Combined Events (Super league) | Szczecin | 1st | Decathlon | 8336 pts |
| 2009 | World Championships | Berlin | 10th | Decathlon | 8281 pts |
| 2010 | World Indoor Championships | Doha | 4th | Heptathlon | 6124 pts |
| 2010 | European Championships | Barcelona | 3rd | Decathlon | 8370 pts |
| 2011 | European Indoor Championships | Paris | 1st | Heptathlon | 6282 pts PB |
| 2012 | World Indoor Championships | Istanbul | 6th | Heptathlon | 5746 pts |

== Personal bests ==
Information from World Athletics profile unless otherwise noted.

=== Outdoor ===
As of 6 July 2025

| Event | Performance | Location | Date |
|---|---|---|---|
| 110 meters hurdles | 13.93 (-0.6 m/s) | Minsk | 17 May 2007 |
| Pole vault | 5.00 m (16 ft 4 3/4 in) | Minsk | 17 May 2007 |
| Shot put | 15.40 m (50 ft 6 1/4 in) | Minsk | 11 July 2014 |
| Discus throw | 47.87 m (157 ft 1/2 in) | Minsk | 12 June 2012 |
| Javelin throw | 67.78 m (222 ft 4 1/2 in) | Minsk | 18 July 2014 |

| Event | Performance | Location | Date | Points |
|---|---|---|---|---|
| Decathlon | —N/a | Götzis | 26–27 May 2007 | 8,617 points |
| 100 meters | 10.86 (+0.2 m/s) | Götzis | 26 May 2007 | 892 points |
| Long jump | 7.90 m (25 ft 11 in) (+0.9 m/s) | Götzis | 26 May 2007 | 1,035 points |
| Shot put | 15.19 m (49 ft 10 in) | Zurich | 12 August 2014 | 801 points |
| High jump | 2.22 m (7 ft 3 1/4 in) | Zurich | 12 August 2014 | 1,012 points |
| 400 meters | 47.17 | Talence | 22 September 2007 | 950 points |
| 110 meters hurdles | 14.05 (-0.1 m/s) | Götzis | 27 May 2007 | 968 points |
| Discus throw | 47.46 m (155 ft 8 1/2 in) | Kladno | 13 August 2014 | 812 points |
| Pole vault | 5.20 m (17 ft 1/2 in) | Hengelo | 29 June 2008 | 972 points |
| Javelin throw | 68.11 m (223 ft 5 1/4 in) | Zurich | 13 August 2014 | 861 points |
| 1500 meters | 4:24.44 | Götzis | 28 May 2006 | 782 points |
| Virtual Best Performance | | | | 9,085 points |

=== Indoor ===
As of 6 July 2025

| Event | Performance | Location | Date |
|---|---|---|---|
| 60 meters hurdles | 7.8h | Mogilev | 14 January 2007 |
| 60 meters hurdles | 8.23 | Minsk | 17 January 2020 |
| Long jump | 7.50 m (24 ft 7 1/4 in) | Mogilev | 22 February 2014 |
| High jump | 2.10 m (6 ft 10 1/2 in) | Mogilev | 17 February 2018 |
| Pole vault | 5.20 m (17 ft 1/2 in) | Mogilev | 21 February 2014 |
| Shot put | 14.39 m (47 ft 2 1/2 in) | Gomel | 8 February 2014 |

| Event | Performance | Location | Date | Points |
|---|---|---|---|---|
| Heptathlon | —N/a | Sopot | 7–8 March 2014 | 6,303 points |
| 60 meters | 7.03 | Tallinn | 15 February 2008 | 872 points |
| Long jump | 7.75 m (25 ft 5 in) | Gomel | 26 January 2012 | 997 points |
| Shot put | 15.42 m (50 ft 7 in) | Sopot | 7 March 2014 | 816 points |
| High jump | 2.21 m (7 ft 3 in) | Sopot | 7 March 2014 | 1,002 points |
| 60 meters hurdles | 7.90 | Mogilev | 21 February 2010 | 1,007 points |
| Pole vault | 5.30 m (17 ft 4 1/2 in) | Valencia | 9 March 2008 | 1,004 points |
| 1000 meters | 2:39.80 | Paris | 6 March 2011 | 876 points |
| Virtual Best Performance | | | | 6,574 points |

== Personal life ==
He is married to fellow Belarusian athlete Yana Maksimava. Amid the forced repatriation and subsequent defection of Belarusian sprinter Krystsina Tsimanouskaya at the Summer Olympics in Tokyo in 2021, Maksimava announced that she and her husband Krauchanka would also not be returning to Belarus and would instead seek asylum in Germany, where the couple trains. Krauchanka had previously been detained in Belarus for taking part in protests against Alexander Lukashenko.
