= 2005 World Championships in Athletics – Men's decathlon =

The men's decathlon competition at the 2005 World Championships in Athletics was held at the Helsinki Olympic Stadium on Tuesday 9 August and Wednesday 10 August.

== Medalists ==
Gold	Bryan Clay; United States (USA)
Silver	Roman Šebrle; Czech Republic (CZE)
Bronze	Attila Zsivoczky; Hungary (HUN)

== Schedule ==
Tuesday, 9 August
1. 100 m
2. Long jump
3. Shot put
4. High jump
5. 400 m

Wednesday, 10 August
6. 110 m hurdles
7. Discus throw
8. Pole vault
9. Javelin throw
10. 1,500 m

== Records ==
World record	Roman Šebrle (CZE)	9026	27 May 2001	Götzis, Austria
Event record	Tomáš Dvořák (CZE)	8902	7 August 2001	Edmonton, Canada

== Final ranking ==
Points table after final event

The best performance in each event is highlighted in yellow. These marks were split between six competitors with the gold medallist claiming four of them.

Rank	Athlete	Overall points	100 m	LJ	SP	HJ	400 m	110 mh	DT	PV	JT	1500 m
1	Bryan Clay; United States	8732 (WL)	992 pts 10.43 s	945; 7.54	867; 16.25	803; 2.00	920; 47.78	920; 14.43	947; 53.68	880; 4.90	920; 72.00	538; 5:03.77
2	Roman Šebrle; Czech Republic	8521	881 pts 10.91 s	1025; 7.86	869; 16.29	859; 2.06	879; 48.62	885; 14.71	805; 46.85	849; 4.80	786; 63.21	683; 4:39.54
3	Attila Zsivoczky; Hungary	8385	883 pts 10.90 s	821; 7.03	834; 15.72	944; 2.15	848; 49.29	831; 15.15	862; 49.58	849; 4.80	783; 63.02	730; 4:32.17
4	André Niklaus; Germany	8316 (PB)	852 pts 11.04 s	862; 7.20	743; 14.24	831; 2.03	842; 49.42	876; 14.78	790; 46.13	1004; 5.30	764; 61.74	752; 4:28.93
5	Aleksandr Pogorelov; Russia	8246	892 pts 10.86 s	932; 7.49	845; 15.90	887; 2.09	788; 50.58	917; 14.45	801; 46.68	910; 5.00	735; 59.79	539; 5:03.62
6	Kristjan Rahnu; Estonia	8223	954 pts 10.59 s	900; 7.36	838; 15.79	831; 2.03	881; 48.58	865; 14.87	811; 47.13	819; 4.70	763; 61.65	561; 4:59.73
7	Romain Barras; France	8087	827 pts 11.15 s	898; 7.35	766; 14.62	749; 1.94	879; 48.63	892; 14.65	751; 44.24	849; 4.80	744; 60.39	732; 4:31.94
8	Tomáš Dvořák; Czech Republic	8068	874 pts 10.94 s	888; 7.31	848; 15.95	803; 2.00	799; 50.34	873; 14.81	781; 45.69	673; 4.20	812; 64.89	717; 4:34.24
9	Jaakko Ojaniemi; Finland	8042 (SB)	935 pts 10.67 s	952; 7.57	787; 14.95	723; 1.91	801; 50.29	845; 15.04	714; 42.41	760; 4.50	833; 66.27	692; 4:38.18
10	Aleksey Drozdov; Russia	8038	845 pts 11.07 s	871; 7.24	816; 15.43	859; 2.06	764; 51.11	770; 15.67	873; 50.13	760; 4.50	793; 63.67	687; 4:38.96
11	Hamdi Dhouibi; Tunisia	8023 (AR)	935 pts 10.67 s	918; 7.43	658; 12.85	749; 1.94	956; 47.04	903; 14.56	688; 41.17	849; 4.80	631; 52.83	736; 4:31.24
12	Mikk Pahapill; Estonia	8003	847 pts 11.06 s	878; 7.27	812; 15.36	859; 2.06	749; 51.44	805; 15.37	784; 45.81	849; 4.80	791; 63.53	629; 4:48.26
13	Paul Terek; United States	7921	899 pts 10.83 s	852; 7.16	747; 14.31	776; 1.97	868; 48.85	752; 15.83	760; 44.65	910; 5.00	655; 54.46	702; 4:36.59
14	Frédéric Xhonneux; Belgium	7616	799 pts 11.28 s	864; 7.21	662; 12.92	831; 2.03	859; 49.04	761; 15.75	637; 38.62	819; 4.70	591; 50.18	793; 4:22.71
15	Roland Schwarzl; Austria	7549	847 pts 11.06 s	838; 7.10	712; 13.73	644; 1.82	778; 50.81	862; 14.90	778; 45.56	880; 4.90	599; 50.67	611; 4:51.25
16	Óscar González; Spain	7526	845 pts 11.07 s	862; 7.20	706; 13.63	803; 2.00	828; 49.71	854; 14.96	604; 37.03	790; 4.60	523; 45.54	711; 4:35.25
17	Phil McMullen; United States	6832	759 pts 11.47 s	732; 6.65	790; 15.01	749; 1.94	805; 50.21	781; 15.58	855; 49.28	0 NM	638; 53.35	723; 4:33.38
	Aleksey Sysoyev; Russia	DNF	924 pts 10.72 s	657; 6.32	836; 15.75	859; 2.06	794; 50.46	791; 15.49	811; 47.13	0 NM		
	Eugène Martineau; Netherlands	DNF	812 pts 11.22 s	850; 7.15	686; 13.31	803; 2.00	794; 50.45	750; 15.85	669; 40.23	0 NM		
	Qi Haifeng; China	DNF	878 pts 10.92 s	857; 7.18	695; 13.45	803; 2.00						
	Claston Bernard; Jamaica	DNF	908 pts 10.79 s	767; 6.80	709; 13.68							
	Maurice Smith; Jamaica	DNF	903 pts 10.81 s	854; 7.17	0 NM							
	Benjamin Jensen; Norway	DNF	852 pts 11.04 s	0 NM								
	Vitaliy Smirnov; Uzbekistan	DNF	0 pts 18.28 s									
	Dmitriy Karpov; Kazakhstan	DNF	0 pts DQ									
	Laurent Hernu; France	DNS										
WR world record | AR area record | CR championship record | GR games record | NR national record | OR Olympic record | PB personal best | SB season best | WL world leading (in a given season)

== See also ==
- 2005 Hypo-Meeting
- 2005 Décastar
- Athletics at the 2005 Summer Universiade – Men's decathlon
- 2005 Decathlon Year Ranking
