= 2005 Décastar =

The 29th edition of the annual Décastar took place on 17 September and 18 September 2005 in Talence, France. The track and field competition, featuring a decathlon (men) and a heptathlon (women) event, was part of the 2005 IAAF World Combined Events Challenge.

== Men's decathlon ==
=== Schedule ===
17 September
1. 100 m
2. Long jump
3. Shot put
4. High jump
5. 400 m

18 September
6. 110 m hurdles
7. Discus throw
8. Pole vault
9. Javelin throw
10. 1,500 m

=== Results ===
Rank	Athlete	Decathlon										Points
Rank	Athlete	1	2	3	4	5	6	7	8	9	10	Points
1	Roman Šebrle (CZE)	11,09	7.60	15.65	2.04	49,03	14,47	45.15	4.80	66.05	4.47,79	8326
2	Aleksandr Pogorelov (RUS)	10,99	7.53	16.07	2.07	51,10	14,25	45.83	5.10	58.24	4.57,40	8247
3	Kristjan Rahnu (EST)	10,72	7.19	14.58	1.92	49,18	14,26	47.72	4.90	63.95	5.01,35	8124
4	Aleksey Drozdov (RUS)	11,34	7.09	15.41	2.07	51,76	15,06	49.52	4.70	67.08	4.40,92	8080
5	Romain Barras (FRA)	11,06	7.22	14.29	1.95	50,25	14,31	43.54	4.70	62.09	4.24,65	8060
6	Rudy Bourguignon (FRA)	10,91	7.28	14.30	1.89	50,31	15,03	42.55	5.20	59.70	4.30,19	8025
7	Attila Zsivoczky (HUN)	11,13	6.92	15.09	2.01	49,33	15,01	46.93	4.40	61.04	4.24,64	8000
8	Tomáš Dvořák (CZE)	11,22	7.26	14.99	1.95	50,35	14,67	43.45	4.80	62.41	4.34,71	7996
9	Mikk Pahapill (EST)	11,10	7.48	14.37	2.10	51,74	14,68	44.41	4.50	63.50	4.45,11	7994
10	François Gourmet (BEL)	10,61	7.19	14.16	1.89	47,77	14,81	37.37	4.80	56.31	4.27,02	7950
11	Jaakko Ojaniemi (FIN)	10,88	7.44	15.53	1.95	50,14	15,48	36.62	4.40	64.88	4.38,77	7815
12	Paul Terek (USA)	11,19	7.07	14.15	1.98	49,62	16,19	40.18	5.10	48.65	4.37,46	7589
13	Bruno Lambèse (FRA)	11,21	7.09	14.25	2.01	51,58	14,79	41.34	4.70	46.08	4.36,06	7571
14	Maurice Smith (JAM)	10,86	7.03	15.55	1.92	49,31	14,07	48.25	NM	57.65	4.33,99	7336
—	Nicolas Moulay (FRA)	11,19	7.02	13.01	1.95	49,79	—	—	—	—	—	DNF
—	Julien Choffart (FRA)	11,24	7.20	12.89	1.80	—	—	—	—	—	—	DNF
—	Nadir El Fassi (FRA)	11,00	7.35	—	—	—	—	—	—	—	—	DNF

== Women's heptathlon ==
=== Schedule ===
17 September
1. 100 m hurdles
2. High jump
3. Shot put
4. 200 m

September 18
5. Long jump
6. Javelin throw
7. 800 m

=== Results ===
Rank	Athlete	Heptathlon							Points
Rank	Athlete	1	2	3	4	5	6	7	Points
1	Eunice Barber (FRA)	12,96	1.87	13.65	24,08	6.72	47.66	2:18,79	6675
2	Kelly Sotherton (GBR)	13,32	1.75	13.91	23,64	6.39	34.79	2:11,60	6278
3	Lyudmila Blonska (UKR)	13,62	1.78	12.19	24,58	6.49	45.57	2:13,48	6278
4	Nataliya Dobrynska (UKR)	13,71	1.78	14.95	25,22	6.17	45.70	2:17,50	6235
5	Virginia Johnson (USA)	13,12	1.72	12.65	23,72	6.45	40.46	2:20,73	6178
6	Marie Collonvillé (FRA)	13,82	1.81	12.58	25,25	6.31	44.99	2:14,05	6174
7	Karin Ruckstuhl (NED)	13,60	1.78	13.49	24,58	6.29	37.65	2:15,07	6129
8	Yvonne Wisse (NED)	13,49	1.81	11.92	24,29	5.82	33.33	2:12,43	5916
9	Amandine Constantin (FRA)	13,56	1.78	11.13	25,06	5.94	36.16	2:30,76	5587
10	Vera Epimashka (BLR)	14,66	1.63	15.66	27,16	5.46	36.76	2:40,23	5125

== See also ==
- 2005 World Championships in Athletics – Men's decathlon
- 2005 Hypo-Meeting
- 2005 Decathlon Year Ranking
- Athletics at the 2005 Summer Universiade – Men's decathlon
- 2005 World Championships in Athletics – Women's heptathlon
