= Athletics at the 2008 Summer Olympics – Men's decathlon =

Men's decathlon at the Games of the XXIX Olympiad
- Venue: Beijing National Stadium
- Dates: August 21–22
- Competitors: 40 from 27 nations
- Winning points: 8791

Medalists
| 1st place, gold medalist(s) | | Bryan Clay | United States |
| 2nd place, silver medalist(s) | | Andrei Krauchanka | Belarus |
| 3rd place, bronze medalist(s) | | Leonel Suárez | Cuba |

The men's decathlon at the 2008 Summer Olympics took place between August 21 and 22, at the Beijing National Stadium.

The qualifying standards were 8,000 points (A standard) and 7,700 points (B standard).

== Schedule ==
All times are China standard time (UTC+8)

| Date | Time | Round |
|---|---|---|
| Thursday, 21 August 2008 | 9:20; 11:00; 13:10; 19:10; 22:00 | 100 metres Long jump Shot put High jump 400 metres |
| Friday, 22 August 2008 | 09:00; 10:05; 12:55; 19:00; 21:40 | 110 metres hurdles Discus throw Pole vault Javelin throw 1500 metres |

== Records ==
Prior to this competition, the existing world and Olympic records were as follows:

| World record | (Czech Republic) Roman Šebrle (CZE) | 9026 points | Götzis, Austria | 27 May 2001 |
| Olympic record | Roman Šebrle (CZE) | 8893 points | Athens, Greece | 24 August 2004 |

== Overall results ==
Key

The highest mark recorded in each event is highlighted in yellow. Since four men cleared 2.11 metres in the high jump, these marks were split between ten competitors with the gold medallist claiming four of them.

| Rank | Athlete | Country | Overall points | 100 m | LJ | SP | HJ | 400 m | 110 m H | DT | PV | JT | 1500 m |
|---|---|---|---|---|---|---|---|---|---|---|---|---|---|
| 1st place, gold medalist(s) | Bryan Clay | United States | 8791 | 989; 10.44 s | 1005; 7.78 m | 868; 16.27 m | 794; 1.99 m | 865; 48.92 s | 984; 13.93 s | 950; 53.79 m | 910; 5.00 m | 904; 70.97 m | 522; 5:06.59 min |
| 2nd place, silver medalist(s) | Andrei Krauchanka | Belarus | 8551 | 870; 10.96 s | 962; 7.61 m | 752; 14.39 m | 906; 2.11 m | 943; 47.30 s | 948; 14.21 s | 758; 44.58 m | 910; 5.00 m | 741; 60.23 m | 761; 4:27.47 min |
| 3rd place, bronze medalist(s) | Leonel Suárez | Cuba | 8527 (NR) | 883; 10.90 s | 893; 7.33 m | 758; 14.49 m | 850; 2.05 m | 913; 47.91 s | 955; 14.15 s | 756; 44.45 m | 819; 4.70 m | 950; 73.98 m | 750; 4:29.17 min |
| 4 | Romain Barras | France | 8253 (SB) | 804; 11.26 s | 833; 7.08 m | 816; 15.42 m | 767; 1.96 m | 837; 49.51 s | 948; 14.21 s | 770; 45.17 m | 910; 5.00 m | 819; 65.40 m | 749; 4:29.29 min |
| 5 | Roman Šebrle | Czech Republic | 8241 (SB) | 814; 11.21 s | 980; 7.68 m | 776; 14.78 m | 906; 2.11 m | 836; 49.54 s | 885; 14.71 s | 777; 45.50 m | 849; 4.80 m | 797; 63.93 m | 621; 4:49.63 min |
| 6 | Oleksiy Kasyanov | Ukraine | 8238 (SB) | 968; 10.53 s | 950; 7.56 m | 799; 15.15 m | 767; 1.96 m | 924; 47.70 s | 927; 14.37 s | 837; 48.39 m | 702; 4.30 m | 612; 51.59 m | 752; 4:28.94 min |
| 7 | André Niklaus | Germany | 8220 | 834; 11.12 s | 883; 7.29 m | 681; 13.23 m | 850; 2.05 m | 831; 49.65 s | 927; 14.37 s | 775; 45.39 m | 972; 5.20 m | 741; 60.21 m | 726; 4:32.90 min |
| 8 | Maurice Smith | Jamaica | 8205 | 894; 10.85 s | 823; 7.04 m | 795; 15.09 m | 794; 1.99 m | 911; 47.96 s | 964; 14.08 s | 889; 50.91 m | 790; 4.60 m | 611; 51.52 m | 734; 4:31.62 min |
| 9 | Michael Schrader | Germany | 8194 | 906; 10.80 s | 985; 7.70 m | 708; 13.67 m | 794; 1.99 m | 886; 48.47 s | 885; 14.71 s | 673; 40.41 m | 849; 4.80 m | 742; 60.27 m | 766; 4:26.77 min |
| 10 | Mikk Pahapill | Estonia | 8178 (PB) | 827; 11.15 s | 823; 7.04 m | 750; 14.36 m | 906; 2.11 m | 774; 50.90 s | 910; 14.51 s | 857; 49.35 m | 849; 4.80 m | 845; 67.07 m | 637; 4:47.03 min |
| 11 | Aleksey Drozdov | Russia | 8154 | 856; 11.02 s | 869; 7.23 m | 867; 16.26 m | 822; 2.02 m | 744; 51.56 s | 789; 15.51 s | 817; 47.43 m | 941; 5.10 m | 777; 62.57 m | 672; 4:41.34 min |
| 12 | Andres Raja | Estonia | 8118 (PB) | 885; 10.89 s | 883; 7.29 m | 777; 14.79 m | 767; 1.96 m | 862; 48.98 s | 967; 14.06 s | 661; 39.83 m | 849; 4.80 m | 846; 67.16 m | 621; 4:49.60 min |
| 13 | Eugène Martineau | Netherlands | 8055 | 819; 11.19 s | 859; 7.19 m | 715; 13.78 m | 794; 1.99 m | 815; 49.99 s | 882; 14.73 s | 748; 44.09 m | 819; 4.70 m | 911; 71.44 m | 693; 4:37.96 min |
| 14 | Yordanis García | Cuba | 7992 | 942; 10.64 s | 830; 7.07 m | 840; 15.82 m | 767; 1.96 m | 830; 49.66 s | 987; 13.90 s | 598; 36.73 m | 819; 4.70 m | 822; 65.60 m | 557; 5:00.49 min |
| 15 | Mikalai Shubianok | Belarus | 7906 (SB) | 793; 11.31 s | 781; 6.86 m | 782; 14.88 m | 794; 1.99 m | 814; 50.02 s | 908; 14.52 s | 783; 45.80 m | 790; 4.60 m | 769; 62.10 m | 692; 4:38.14 min |
| 16 | Aliaksandr Parkhomenka | Belarus | 7838 | 797; 11.29 s | 811; 6.99 m | 820; 15.49 m | 740; 1.93 m | 782; 50.71 s | 842; 15.06 s | 772; 45.27 m | 819; 4.70 m | 807; 64.60 m | 648; 4:45.17 min |
| 17 | Qi Haifeng | China | 7835 (SB) | 827; 11.15 s | 866; 7.22 m | 692; 13.40 m | 740; 1.93 m | 843; 49.39 s | 899; 14.60 s | 797; 46.46 m | 702; 4.30 m | 784; 63.09 m | 685; 4:39.32 min |
| 18 | Massimo Bertocchi | Canada | 7714 | 861; 11.00 s | 826; 7.05 m | 734; 14.10 m | 714; 1.90 m | 875; 48.72 s | 934; 14.32 s | 765; 44.91 m | 819; 4.70 m | 520; 45.33 m | 666; 4:42.26 min |
| 19 | Jangy Addy | Liberia | 7665 (NR) | 915; 10.76 s | 905; 7.38 m | 784; 14.91 m | 740; 1.93 m | 885; 48.51 s | 935; 14.31 s | 711; 42.30 m | 673; 4.20 m | 626; 52.50 m | 491; 5:12.22 min |
| 20 | Daniel Awde | Great Britain | 7516 | 847; 11.06 s | 842; 7.12 m | 608; 12.03 m | 610; 1.78 m | 950; 47.16 s | 887; 14.69 s | 606; 37.12 m | 880; 4.90 m | 636; 53.18 m | 650; 4:44.80 min |
| 21 | Hadi Sepehrzad | Iran | 7483 | 878; 10.92 s | 767; 6.80 m | 852; 16.02 m | 714; 1.90 m | 780; 50.75 s | 894; 14.64 s | 877; 50.32 m | 617; 4.00 m | 582; 49.56 m | 522; 5:06.67 min |
| 22 | Damjan Sitar | Slovenia | 7336 | 814; 11.21 s | 874; 7.25 m | 631; 12.41 m | 850; 2.05 m | 810; 50.10 s | 846; 15.03 s | 649; 39.25 m | 617; 4.00 m | 548; 47.23 m | 697; 4:37.37 min |
| 23 | Slaven Dizdarevič | Slovakia | 7021 | 825; 11.16 s | 818; 7.02 m | 727; 13.97 m | 767; 1.96 m | 724; 52.02 s | 777; 15.61 s | 662; 39.86 m | 617; 4.00 m | 494; 43.58 m | 610; 4:51.42 min |
| 24 | David Gómez | Spain | 6876 | 834; 11.12 s | 778; 6.85 m | 703; 13.58 m | 636; 1.81 m | 849; 49.27 s | 897; 14.61 s | 668; 40.17 m | 0 NM | 771; 62.22 m | 740; 4:30.74 min |
| 25 | Mikko Halvari | Finland | 6486 | 821; 11.18 s | 785; 6.88 m | 711; 13.72 m | 740; 1.93 m | 787; 50.60 s | 705; 16.25 s | 823; 47.71 m | 0 NM | 665; 55.11 m | 449; 5:20.26 min |
| —N/a | Gonzalo Barroilhet | Chile | DNF | 789; 11.33 s | 833; 7.08 m | 681; 13.23 m | 740; 1.93 m | 729; 51.91 s | 941; 14.26 s | 789; 46.07 m | 0 NM | DNS | DNS |
| —N/a | Trey Hardee | United States | DNF | 970; 10.52 s | 990; 7.72 m | 697; 13.49 m | 850; 2.05 m | 921; 47.75 s | 949; 14.20 s | 737; 43.55 m | 0 NM | DNS | DNS |
| —N/a | Jānis Karlivāns | Latvia | DNF | 782; 11.36 s | 876; 7.26 m | 780; 14.85 m | 661; 1.84 m | 742; 51.61 s | 816; 15.28 s | 757; 44.54 m | DNS | DNS | DNS |
| —N/a | Alexey Sysoev | Russia | DNF | 854; 11.03 s | 760; 6.77 m | 816; 15.42 m | 906; 2.11 m | 782; 50.71 s | 0 DNF | DNS | DNS | DNS | DNS |
| —N/a | Carlos Chinin | Brazil | DNF | 863; 10.99 s | 799; 6.94 m | 0 NM | 794; 1.99 m | 851; 49.21 s | DNS | DNS | DNS | DNS | DNS |
| —N/a | Pavel Andreev | Uzbekistan | DNF | 759; 11.47 s | 725; 6.62 m | 738; 14.15 m | 794; 1.99 m | 0 DNF | DNS | DNS | DNS | DNS | DNS |
| —N/a | Frédéric Xhonneux | Belgium | DNF | 771; 11.41 s | 799; 6.94 m | 728; 13.99 m | 714; 1.90 m | 0 DNF | DNS | DNS | DNS | DNS | DNS |
| —N/a | Victor Covalenco | Moldova | DNF | 677; 11.87 s | 697; 6.50 m | 694; 13.44 m | 636; 1.81 m | 0 DNF | DNS | DNS | DNS | DNS | DNS |
| —N/a | Arthur Abele | Germany | DNF | 883; 10.90 s | 691; 6.47 m | 701; 13.55 m | 714; 1.90 m | DNS | DNS | DNS | DNS | DNS | DNS |
| —N/a | Hans van Alphen | Belgium | DNF | 799; 11.28 s | 709; 6.55 m | 781; 14.86 m | 661; 1.84 m | DNS | DNS | DNS | DNS | DNS | DNS |
| —N/a | Vitaliy Smirnov | Uzbekistan | DNF | 740; 11.56 s | 0 NM | 698; 13.51 m | DNS | DNS | DNS | DNS | DNS | DNS | DNS |
| —N/a | Tom Pappas | United States | DNF | 834; 11.12 s | 913; 7.41 m | DNS | DNS | DNS | DNS | DNS | DNS | DNS | DNS |
| —N/a | Attila Zsivoczky | Hungary | DNF | 679; 11.86 s | 0 NM | DNS | DNS | DNS | DNS | DNS | DNS | DNS | DNS |
| —N/a | Dmitriy Karpov | Kazakhstan | DNF | 685; 11.83 s | DNS | DNS | DNS | DNS | DNS | DNS | DNS | DNS | DNS |
| DSQ | Aleksandr Pogorelov | Russia | 8328 | 845; 11.07 s | 903; 7.37 m | 884; 16.53 m | 878; 2.08 m | 773; 50.91 s | 915; 14.47 s | 871; 50.04 m | 910; 5.00 m | 798; 64.01 m | 551; 5:01.56 min |
