= Andres Raja =

Estonian decathlete

Personal information
- Born: 2 June 1982 (age 44) St. Petersburg
- Height: 187 cm (6 ft 2 in)

Sport
- Country: Estonia
- Sport: Athletics
- Event: Decathlon

Achievements and titles
- Personal best(s): Decathlon: 8119; Heptathlon: 6114

Andres Raja (born 2 June 1982) is a retired Estonian decathlete.

Raja was born in Leningrad. He finished sixteenth at the 2007 World Championships and sixth at the 2008 World Indoor Championships.

He set a personal best score of 8119 points in August at 2009 World Championships in Athletics. His second best result is 8118 achieved in August 2008 at the Olympics after qualifying to the games with personal best 8069 points, achieved in July 2008 in Rakvere.

Raja finished tenth at the 2010 European Championships in Barcelona with 7991 points. He was second in the heptathlon at the Tallinn International meet, scoring a personal best of 6114 points, while winner Ashton Eaton broke the world record.

== Achievements ==
Year	Competition	Venue	Position	Event	Result
2004	National Championships	Rakvere, Estonia	2nd	Decathlon	7095
2005	National Championships	Rakvere, Estonia	1st	Decathlon	7608
2005	European Combined Events Super League Cup	Bydgoszcz, Poland	1st	Decathlon	7434
2006	National Championships	Rakvere, Estonia	1st	Decathlon	7809 PB
2006	European Combined Events Super League Cup	Arles, France	3rd	Decathlon	7016
2007	World Championships	Osaka, Japan	16th	Decathlon	7794
2007	European Combined Events Super League Cup	Tallinn, Estonia	6th	Decathlon	7834 PB
2008	World Indoor Championships	Valencia, Spain	6th	Heptathlon	5894
2008	European Combined Events Super League Cup	Hengelo, Netherlands	3rd	Decathlon	7964 PB
2008	Olympic Games	Beijing, China	13th	Decathlon	8118 PB
2009	European Indoor Championships	Turin, Italy	11th	Heptathlon	5800
2009	European Combined Events Super League Cup	Bydgoszcz, Poland	5th	Decathlon	7860
2009	World Championships	Berlin, Germany	15th	Decathlon	8119 PB
2010	European Championships	Barcelona, Spain	10th	Decathlon	7991
2011	European Indoor Championships	Paris, France	–	Heptathlon	DNF
2011	World Championships	Daegu, South Korea	15th	Decathlon	7982
