= Paolo Mottadelli =

Italian decathlete

Personal information
- National team: Italy: 8 caps (2002-2009)
- Born: 7 June 1979 (age 47) Giussano, Italy
- Height: 1.93 m (6 ft 4 in)
- Weight: 87 kg (192 lb)

Sport
- Sport: Athletics
- Event: Combined events
- Club: Atletica Cento Torri Pavia
- Coached by: Roberto Caglio
- Retired: 2015

Achievements and titles
- Personal bests: Decathlon: 7552 (2004); Heptathlon: 4983 (2004)

Paolo Mottadelli (born 8 June 1979) is a former Italian decathlete.

== Achievements ==
Senior

Year	Competition	Venue	Rank	Event	Points	Notes
2002	European Cup Combined Events (FL)	(Latvia) Riga	10th	Decathlon	7288 pts	
2003	European Cup Combined Events (SL)	(Italy) Brixen	14th	Decathlon	7455 pts	
2005	European Cup Combined Events (SL)	(Poland) Bydgoszcz	27th	Decathlon	6491 pts	
2005	Universiade	(Turkey) İzmir	8th	Decathlon	7277 pts	
2006	European Cup Combined Events (SL)	(France) Arles	17th	Decathlon	7402 pts	
2007	European Cup Combined Events (SL)	(Estonia) Tallinn	19th	Decathlon	7392 pts	
2008	European Cup Combined Events (FL)	(Finland) Jyväskylä	16th	Decathlon	7079 pts	
2009	European Cup Combined Events (FL)	(Spain) Zaragoza	10th	Decathlon	7462 pts	

== National titles ==
Mottadelli won six national championships at individual senior level.

- Italian Athletics Championships
  - Decathlon: 2004, 2005, 2007, 2008, 2009, 2011 (6)
