= Damjan Sitar =

Slovenian decathlete

Personal information
- Nationality: Slovenia
- Born: 17 August 1981 (age 44) Maribor, SR Slovenia, SFR Yugoslavia
- Height: 1.96 m (6 ft 5 in)
- Weight: 88 kg (194 lb)

Sport
- Sport: Athletics
- Event: Decathlon

Achievements and titles
- Personal best: Decathlon: 7,718 points (2008)

Damjan Sitar (born August 17, 1981 in Maribor) is a Slovenian decathlete. He set both a national record and a personal best score of 7,718 points, by winning his event at the 2008 Slovenian Open Athletics Championships, coincidentally in his home city.

Sitar represented Slovenia at the 2008 Summer Olympics in Beijing, where he competed in men's decathlon. During the event, he set a personal best of 47.23 metres in the javelin throw, but received poor scores in the shot put, discus throw, and pole vault, which cost him a chance for a medal. In the end, Sitar finished only in twenty-third place, with a total score of 7,336 points.

== Personal bests ==
Event	Performance	Location	Date
100 metres	11.04	Maribor	May 28, 2005
400 metres	49.31	Maribor	July 2, 2005
1500 metres	4:23.76	Maribor	May 31, 2008
110 metres hurdles	14.46	Maribor	May 28, 2006
Long jump	7.43	Maribor	May 27, 2006
High jump	2.12	Maribor	May 27, 2006
Pole vault	4.50	Maribor	May 31, 2008
Shot put	13.54	Ljubljana	June 3, 2007
Discus throw	43.41	Maribor	May 31, 2008
Javelin throw	47.23	Beijing	August 22, 2008
Decathlon	7718	Maribor	May 31, 2008
Heptathlon (indoor)	5751	Linz	February 12, 2006

- All information taken from IAAF profile.
