= 2010 IAAF World Indoor Championships =

13th IAAF World Indoor Championships
- Official competition logo
- Dates: 12 March–14 March
- Host city: Doha, Qatar
- Venue: Aspire Dome
- Events: 26
- Participation: 585 athletes from 146 nations

The 2010 IAAF World Indoor Championships in Athletics was held between 12 and 14 March at the Aspire Dome in Doha, Qatar. The championships was the first of six IAAF World Athletics Series events to take place in 2010.

== Bidding and organisation ==
The IAAF announced on March 25, 2007, at an IAAF Council meeting in Mombasa, Kenya that it had received bids from Turkey and Qatar to host the championships. On November 25, in a Council meeting in Monaco, the IAAF announced that Doha would host the championships. This was the first time that a world athletics championship was held in the Middle-East and the second time the World Indoor Championships was held outside of Europe or North America (after the 1999 Championships in Japan).

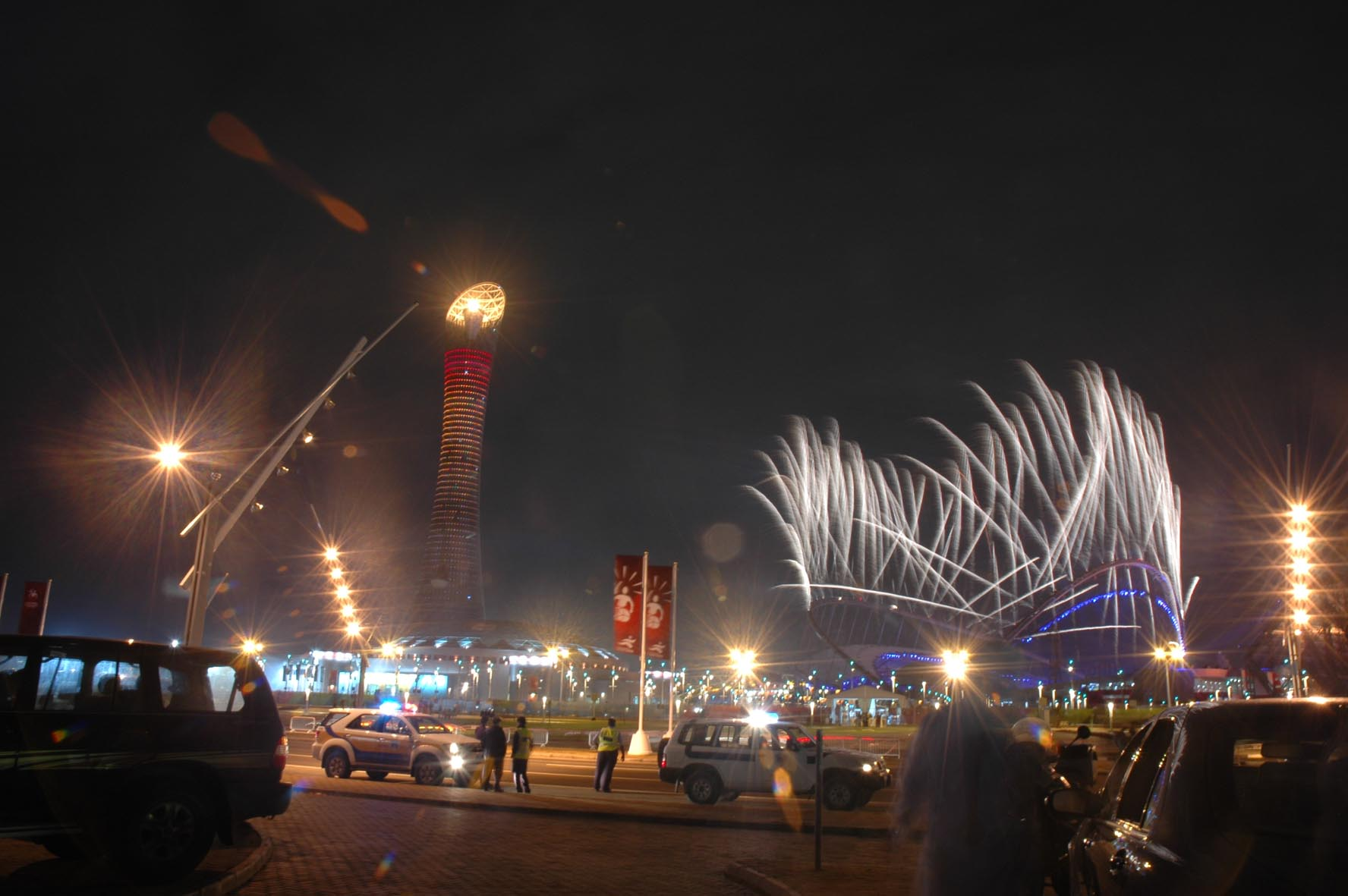
The Aspire Zone during the 2006 Asian Games

The venue for the event was the indoor arena located within Doha's Aspire Zone – the ASPIRE Dome, which has previously hosted indoor athletics for the 2008 Asian Indoor Athletics Championships. The World Indoor Championships was the first of two significant athletics events to take place in Doha in 2010 – the inaugural 2010 IAAF Diamond League will begin with the Qatar Athletic Super Grand Prix meeting in May.

Prior to the championships, the Qatar organising committee held the Doha Indoor Athletics Meeting for Juniors as a test event for the venue. The meeting began on 26 February and featured junior athletes from 11 countries within the region competing in a total of 13 events.

The competition set a new high for the number of nations at the World Indoor Championships: 150 countries sent teams to the championships, with a total of 374 men and 283 women athletes entered to compete.

The competition mascot was an anthropomorphic caracal named Saham – the caracal is a medium-sized cat which is native to the Middle-East. The inclusion of a mascot follows on from the mainstream success of the 2009 World Championships in Athletics mascot – Berlino the Bear.

The IAAF extended live audio and video coverage of the championships to the internet for certain countries, including a deal with IEC in Sports which saw events available live and on-demand via Dailymotion. This was the first deal of its kind for the competition.

=== Drug tests ===
Anna Alminova, a Russian athlete who competed in the 1500 m failed a drug test while at the championships. She tested positive for pseudoephedrine, which was present in a cold medicine she was taking, and received a three-month ban.

== Schedule ==
Legend
Key	P	Q	H	½	F
Value	Preliminary round	Qualifiers	Heats	Semifinals	Final

All dates are AST (UTC+3)

Men
Date →	12		13			14		
Event ↓	M	A	M	A		M	A	
60 m		H		1/2	F			
400 m	H	1/2		F				
800 m	H		1/2				F	
1500 m		H		F				
3000 m		H					F	
60 m hurdles		H					1/2	F
4 × 400 m relay			H				F	
Long jump		Q		F				
Triple jump		Q					F	
High jump		Q					F	
Pole vault	Q			F				
Shot put	Q			F				
Heptathlon	F							

Women
Date →	12		13			14		
Event ↓	M	A	M	A		M	A	
60 m		H					1/2	F
400 m	H	1/2		F				
800 m	H						F	
1500 m		H					F	
3000 m		H		F				
60 m hurdles		H		1/2	F			
4 × 400 m relay							F	
Long jump			Q				F	
Triple jump	Q			F				
High jump	Q			F				
Pole vault		Q					F	
Shot put			Q				F	
Pentathlon			F					

== Results ==
=== Men ===
2006 | 2008 | 2010 | 2012 | 2014

Event	Gold		Silver		Bronze	
60 m	Dwain Chambers; Great Britain	6.48 WL	Mike Rodgers; United States	6.53	Daniel Bailey; Antigua and Barbuda	6.57
400 m	Chris Brown; Bahamas	45.96 SB	William Collazo; Cuba	46.31 PB	Jamaal Torrance; United States	46.43
800 m	Abubaker Kaki; Sudan	1:46.23 SB	Boaz Kiplagat Lalang; Kenya	1:46.39	Adam Kszczot; Poland	1:46.69
1500 m	Deresse Mekonnen; Ethiopia	3:41.86	Abdalaati Iguider; Morocco	3:41.96	Haron Keitany; Kenya	3:42.32
3000 m	Bernard Lagat; United States	7:37.97 SB	Sergio Sánchez; Spain	7:39.55	Sammy Alex Mutahi; Kenya	7:39.90
60 m hurdles	Dayron Robles; Cuba	7.34 CR	Terrence Trammell; United States	7.36 NR	David Oliver; United States	7.44 PB
4 × 400 m relay	United States; Jamaal Torrance; Greg Nixon; Tavaris Tate; Bershawn Jackson; LeJerald Betters*; Kerron Clement*	3:03.40 WL	Belgium; Cedric van Branteghem; Kévin Borlée; Antoine Gillet; Jonathan Borlée; Nils Duerinck*	3:06.94 NR	Great Britain; Conrad Williams; Nigel Levine; Christopher Clarke; Richard Buck; Luke Lennon-Ford*	3:07.52 SB
High jump	Ivan Ukhov; Russia	2.36	Yaroslav Rybakov; Russia	2.31	Dusty Jonas; United States	2.31
Pole vault	Steven Hooker; Australia	6.01 CR	Malte Mohr; Germany	5.70	Alexander Straub; Germany	5.65
Long jump	Fabrice Lapierre; Australia	8.17	Godfrey Khotso Mokoena; South Africa	8.08 SB	Mitchell Watt; Australia	8.05
Triple jump	Teddy Tamgho; France	17.90 WR	Yoandris Betanzos; Cuba	17.69 PB	Arnie David Girat; Cuba	17.36 SB
Shot put	Christian Cantwell; United States	21.83	Ralf Bartels; Germany	21.44 PB	Dylan Armstrong; Canada	21.39
Heptathlon	Bryan Clay; United States	6204	Trey Hardee; United States	6184	Aleksey Drozdov; Russia	6141
WR world record | AR area record | CR championship record | GR games record | NR national record | OR Olympic record | PB personal best | SB season best | WL world leading (in a given season)

=== Women ===
2006 | 2008 | 2010 | 2012 | 2014

Event	Gold		Silver		Bronze	
60 m	Veronica Campbell-Brown; Jamaica	7.00 PB	Carmelita Jeter; United States	7.05	Ruddy Zang Milama; Gabon; Sheri-Ann Brooks; Jamaica	7.14 7.14 PB
400 m	Debbie Dunn; United States	51.04	Vania Stambolova; Bulgaria	51.50 SB	Amantle Montsho; Botswana	52.53
800 m	Mariya Savinova; Russia	1:58.26 WL	Jenny Meadows; Great Britain	1:58.43 NR	Alysia Johnson; United States	1:59.60 PB
1500 m	Kalkidan Gezahegne; Ethiopia	4:08.14	Natalia Rodríguez; Spain	4:08.30	Gelete Burka; Ethiopia	4:08.39
3000 m	Meseret Defar; Ethiopia	8:51.17	Vivian Cheruiyot; Kenya	8:51.85	Sentayehu Ejigu; Ethiopia	8:52.08
60 m hurdles	LoLo Jones; United States	7.72 CR	Perdita Felicien; Canada	7.86 SB	Priscilla Lopes-Schliep; Canada	7.87
4 × 400 m relay	United States; Debbie Dunn; DeeDee Trotter; Natasha Hastings; Allyson Felix	3:27.34 WL	Czech Republic; Denisa Rosolová; Jitka Bartoničková; Zuzana Bergrová; Zuzana Hejnová	3:30.05 SB	Great Britain; Kim Wall; Vicki Barr; Perri Shakes-Drayton; Lee McConnell	3:30.29 SB
High jump	Blanka Vlašić; Croatia	2.00	Ruth Beitia; Spain	1.98	Chaunte Howard Lowe; United States	1.98 SB
Pole vault	Fabiana Murer; Brazil	4.80	Svetlana Feofanova; Russia	4.80 SB	Anna Rogowska; Poland	4.70
Long jump	Brittney Reese; United States	6.70	Naide Gomes; Portugal	6.67	Keila Costa; Brazil	6.63 SB
Triple jump	Olga Rypakova; Kazakhstan	15.14 WL	Yargelis Savigne; Cuba	14.86 SB	Anna Pyatykh; Russia	14.64 SB
Shot put	Valerie Vili; New Zealand	20.49 AR	Anna Avdeyeva; Russia	19.47 SB	Nadine Kleinert; Germany	19.34 SB
Pentathlon	Jessica Ennis; Great Britain	4937 CR	Nataliya Dobrynska; Ukraine	4851	Hyleas Fountain; United States	4753
WR world record | AR area record | CR championship record | GR games record | NR national record | OR Olympic record | PB personal best | SB season best | WL world leading (in a given season)

== Medal table ==
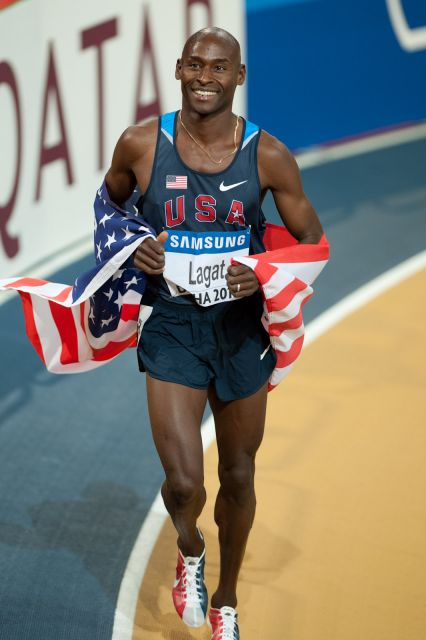
Bernard Lagat became the oldest athlete to win at the championships.

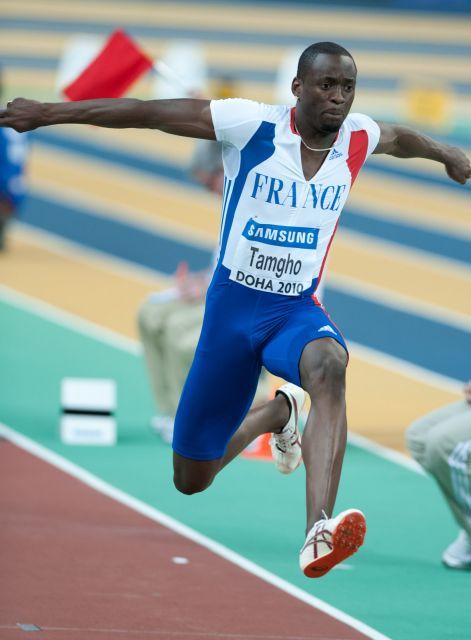
Teddy Tamgho, France's only medallist, set a world indoor record in the triple jump.

Rank	Nation	Gold	Silver	Bronze	Total
1	United States (USA)	8	4	6	18
2	Ethiopia (ETH)	3	0	2	5
3	Russia (RUS)	2	3	2	7
4	Great Britain (GBR)	2	1	2	5
5	Australia (AUS)	2	0	1	3
6	Cuba (CUB)	1	3	1	5
7	Brazil (BRA)	1	0	1	2
7	Jamaica (JAM)	1	0	1	2
9	Bahamas (BAH)	1	0	0	1
9	Croatia (CRO)	1	0	0	1
9	France (FRA)	1	0	0	1
9	Kazakhstan (KAZ)	1	0	0	1
9	New Zealand (NZL)	1	0	0	1
9	Sudan (SUD)	1	0	0	1
15	Spain (ESP)	0	3	0	3
16	Germany (GER)	0	2	2	4
16	Kenya (KEN)	0	2	2	4
18	Canada (CAN)	0	1	2	3
19	Belgium (BEL)	0	1	0	1
19	Bulgaria (BUL)	0	1	0	1
19	Czech Republic (CZE)	0	1	0	1
19	Morocco (MAR)	0	1	0	1
19	Portugal (POR)	0	1	0	1
19	South Africa (RSA)	0	1	0	1
19	Ukraine (UKR)	0	1	0	1
26	Poland (POL)	0	0	2	2
27	Antigua and Barbuda (ATG)	0	0	1	1
27	Botswana (BOT)	0	0	1	1
27	Gabon (GAB)	0	0	1	1
Totals (29 entries)		26	26	27	79

== Participating nations ==
- Netherlands Antilles (2)
- Albania (1)
- Algeria (1)
- Armenia (1)
- Antigua and Barbuda (1)
- Australia (6)
- Austria (3)
- Azerbaijan (2)
- Bahamas (13)
- Belgium (10)
- Bermuda (1)
- Bahrain (2)
- Belarus (9)
- Botswana (8)
- Brazil (9)
- Brunei (1)
- Bulgaria (7)
- Burma (1)
- Canada (6)
- Cayman Islands (1)
- Republic of the Congo (1)
- China (15)
- Ivory Coast (1)
- Cook Islands (1)
- Colombia (1)
- Comoros (1)
- Costa Rica (1)
- Cuba (13)
- Cyprus (2)
- Czech Republic (17)
- Denmark (1)
- Dominican Republic (5)
- Egypt (1)
- Eritrea (1)
- El Salvador (1)
- Spain (14)
- Estonia (3)
- Ethiopia (8)
- Finland (2)
- France (24)
- Federated States of Micronesia (1)
- Gabon (1)
- United Kingdom (30)
- Guinea-Bissau (1)
- Germany (13)
- Ghana (1)
- Greece (7)
- Grenada (1)
- Guinea (1)
- Guam (1)
- Guyana (1)
- Hong Kong (1)
- Hungary (3)
- Indonesia (1)
- Iran (1)
- Israel (1)
- United States Virgin Islands (1)
- Italy (8)
- British Virgin Islands (1)
- Jamaica (13)
- Japan (1)
- Kazakhstan (6)
- Kenya (8)
- Kyrgyzstan (1)
- Kiribati (1)
- South Korea (1)
- Saudi Arabia (3)
- Kuwait (1)
- Latvia (2)
- Liberia (1)
- Lebanon (2)
- Lithuania (5)
- Macau (1)
- Madagascar (1)
- Morocco (5)
- Malaysia (1)
- Moldova (1)
- Maldives (1)
- Mali (1)
- Malta (1)
- Monaco (1)
- Namibia (1)
- Nicaragua (1)
- Netherlands (3)
- Nepal (1)
- Nigeria (1)
- Niger (1)
- Northern Mariana Islands (1)
- Norway (4)
- Nauru (1)
- New Zealand (2)
- Oman (1)
- Pakistan (1)
- Panama (1)
- Paraguay (1)
- Philippines (1)
- Palestine (1)
- Palau (1)
- Papua New Guinea (1)
- Poland (15)
- Portugal (5)
- Puerto Rico (1)
- Qatar (6)
- Romania (3)
- South Africa (5)
- Russia (42)
- Samoa (1)
- Seychelles (1)
- Senegal (1)
- Singapore (1)
- Saint Kitts and Nevis (2)
- Sierra Leone (1)
- Slovenia (2)
- San Marino (2)
- Solomon Islands (1)
- Serbia (3)
- Sri Lanka (1)
- São Tomé and Príncipe (1)
- Sudan (4)
- Switzerland (3)
- Slovakia (2)
- Sweden (8)
- Swaziland (1)
- Syria (1)
- Tanzania (1)
- Tonga (1)
- Thailand (1)
- Tajikistan (1)
- Turkmenistan (1)
- Togo (1)
- Chinese Taipei (1)
- Trinidad and Tobago (3)
- Turkey (3)
- Uruguay (1)
- Ukraine (18)
- United States (51)
- Uzbekistan (3)
- Vanuatu (1)
- Venezuela (1)
- Saint Vincent and the Grenadines (1)
- Yemen (1)
- Zambia (1)
- Zimbabwe (1)
