= Trey Hardee =

American track and field athlete

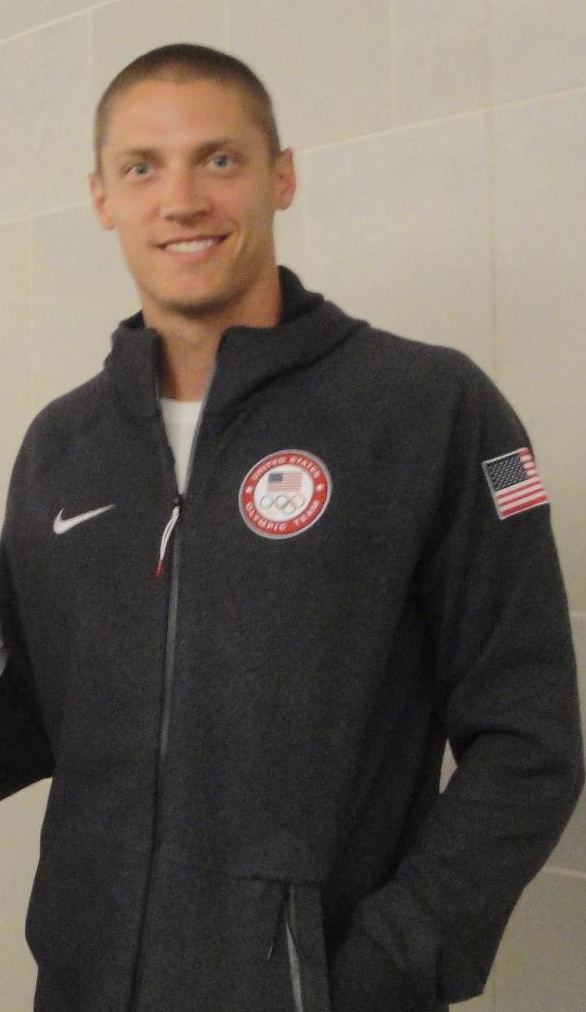
- Trey Hardee at DTW 8/12/12

Personal information
- Nationality: United States
- Born: February 7, 1984 (age 42) Birmingham, Alabama, U.S.
- Height: 6 ft 5 in (1.96 m)
- Weight: 210 lb (95 kg)

Sport
- Country: United States
- Sport: Track and Field
- Events: Decathlon, Heptathlon
- College team: Mississippi State Bulldogs; Texas Longhorns

Achievements and titles
- Personal bests: Decathlon: 8,790 (2009); Heptathlon: 6,208 (2006)
Medal record
Men's athletics
Representing the United States
Olympic Games
Silver medal – second place	2012 London	Decathlon
World Championships
Gold medal – first place	2009 Berlin	Decathlon
Gold medal – first place	2011 Daegu	Decathlon
World Indoor Championships
Silver medal – second place	2010 Doha	Heptathlon

James Edward "Trey" Hardee III (born February 7, 1984) is a retired American track and field athlete who specialized in the combined events. He is a former NCAA Champion, a two-time World Outdoor Champion, a member of the United States 2008 Olympic team, and the silver medalist in the decathlon at the London 2012 Olympics.

== High school and college career ==
Hardee did not start out as a decathlete. He preferred basketball, and only joined the track and field team as a junior, after failing to make the basketball varsity squad at Vestavia Hills High School in Vestavia Hills, Alabama. He was recruited to Mississippi State University as a pole vaulter. Hardee started college at Mississippi State in 2002. It was at the university that coaches, noting his combination of size and speed, pushed him toward the decathlon and the indoor heptathlon. He finished second in the decathlon at the 2004 NCAA Outdoor Championships.

Mississippi State dropped its indoor track and field program after the 2004 season, so Hardee transferred to the University of Texas. In his first season at Texas, he was third in the heptathlon at the 2005 NCAA Indoor Championships and won the decathlon at the 2005 NCAA Outdoor Championships. In 2006, he set the NCAA decathlon record with a then personal best 8,465 points and was named the 2006 NCAA Division I Men's Indoor Field Athlete of the Year.

== Professional career ==
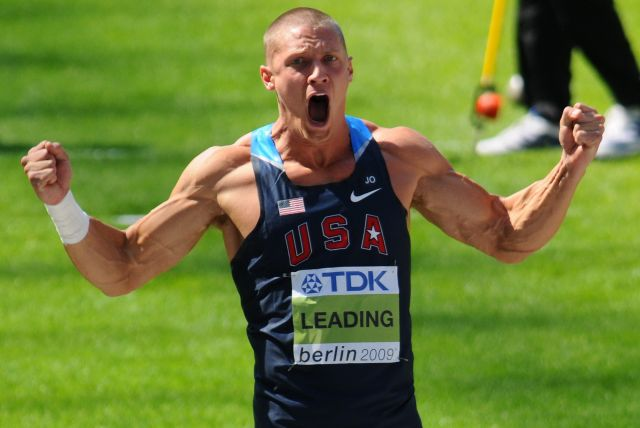
Hardee at the 2009 World Athletics Championships

Hardee was the runner-up in the decathlon at the 2008 US Olympic Trials and made his first Olympic team. At the Olympics, he was in 4th place through seven events when his no-height score in the pole vault cost him a chance to medal. His performances during the 2008 outdoor season garnered interest from the New York Jets of the National Football League, who offered him a tryout. However, he expressed no interest in pursuing the opportunity.

At the 2009 World Athletics Championships in Berlin, Hardee won gold in the decathlon with a points total of 8790, which is his personal record. In the same year, he won the USA Outdoor championship with a score of 8,261. At the 2010 IAAF World Indoor Championships, he won a silver medal in the heptathlon by finishing behind Bryan Clay. Hardee finished with a points total of 6184, which was 20 points behind Clay. At the 2011 World Championships in Athletics, Hardee defeated his compatriot Ashton Eaton and retained the world decathlon title with a final points tally of 8607.

In 2012, Hardee again finished second in the Olympic Trials and made a second Olympic Team. On August 9, 2012, he won the silver medal at the London 2012 Olympics behind Eaton. Hardee attempted to make a third Olympic team in 2016, but was unsuccessful due to injury. He did attend the Olympics as a television analyst for NBC Sports.

== Personal bests ==
Information from World Athletics profile unless otherwise noted.

=== Outdoor ===
As of July 5, 2025

Event	Performance	Location	Date
100 meters	10.40 (+1.8 m/s)	Austin	April 2, 2008
100 meters	10.28 (+2.6 m/s)	Austin	May 27, 2006
200 meters	20.98 (+0.1 m/s)	Austin	April 22, 2006
300 meters	33.69	San Marcos	May 23, 2014
400 meters	48.13	Austin	April 21, 2012
110 meters hurdles	13.61 (+1.9 m/s)	Austin	March 31, 2012
Long jump	7.64 m (25 ft 3/4 in) (+1.4 m/s)	Des Moines	June 27, 2010
Long jump	7.74 m (25 ft 4 1/2 in) (+3.2 m/s)	Austin	April 8, 2011
High jump	1.95 m (6 ft 4 3/4 in)	Austin	March 31, 2004
Pole vault	5.21 m (17 ft 1 in)	Austin	May 27, 2006
Shot put	15.28 m (50 ft 1 1/2 in)	Atlanta	May 17, 2013
Discus throw	51.59 m (169 ft 3 in)	Austin	April 14, 2012
Javelin throw	62.90 m (206 ft 4 1/4 in)	Austin	April 12, 2014

Event	Performance	Location	Date	Points
Decathlon	—N/a	Berlin	August 19–20, 2009	8,790 points
100 meters	10.39 (+0.2 m/s)	Götzis	May 29, 2010	1,001 points
100 meters	10.35 (+2.5 m/s)	Austin	April 5, 2006	—N/a
Long jump	7.88 m (25 ft 10 in) (+0.6 m/s)	Götzis	May 28, 2011	1,030 points
Shot put	15.72 m (51 ft 6 3/4 in)	Eugene	June 22, 2012	834 points
High jump	2.05 m (6 ft 8 1/2 in)	Beijing	August 21, 2008	850 points
400 meters	47.51	Sacramento	June 7, 2006	933 points
110 meters hurdles	13.54 (+0.1 m/s)	London	August 9, 2012	1,035 points
Discus throw	52.38 m (171 ft 10 in)	Austin	April 3, 2008	920 points
Pole vault	5.35 m (17 ft 6 1/2 in)	Eugene	June 26, 2015	1,020 points
Javelin throw	68.99 m (226 ft 4 in)	Daegu	August 28, 2011	874 points
1500 meters	4:40.94	London	August 9, 2012	674 points
Virtual Best Performance				9,171 points

=== Indoor ===
As of July 5, 2025

Event	Performance	Location	Date
55 meters	6.30	Houston	January 14, 2006
60 meters	6.82	New York	February 2, 2007
400 meters	50.35	Stockholm	February 10, 2010
60 meters hurdles	7.76	Ames	February 23, 2007
Long jump	7.85 m (25 ft 9 in)	Fayetteville	March 2, 2007
High jump	1.96 m (6 ft 5 in)	New York	January 28, 2011
Pole vault	5.20 m (17 ft 1/2 in)	Reno	January 18, 2013
Shot put	15.94 m (52 ft 3 1/2 in)	New York	January 28, 2011

Event	Performance	Location	Date	Points
Heptathlon	—N/a	Alburquerque	January 26–27, 2006	6,208 points
60 meters	6.71	Fayetteville	March 10, 2006	988 points
Long jump	7.73 m (25 ft 4 1/4 in)	Alburquerque	January 26, 2006	992 points
Shot put	15.63 m (51 ft 3 1/4 in)	Apeldoorn	February 15, 2014	828 points
High jump	2.06 m (6 ft 9 in)	Doha	March 12, 2010	859 points
60 meters hurdles	7.70 m (25 ft 3 in)	Gothenburg	February 2, 2010	1,059 points
Pole vault	5.30 m (17 ft 4 1/2 in)	Albuquerque	January 27, 2006	1,004 points
1000 meters	2:45.67	Bloomington	March 4, 2012	811 points
Virtual Best Performance				6,541 points

== Honors and awards ==
In 2006, Hardee was named the NCAA Division I Men's Indoor Field Athlete of the Year. In 2009, he received the Jim Thorpe All-Around Award. In 2018, he was inducted into the Texas Track and Field Hall of Honor.
