= Aleksey Drozdov =

Russian decathlete

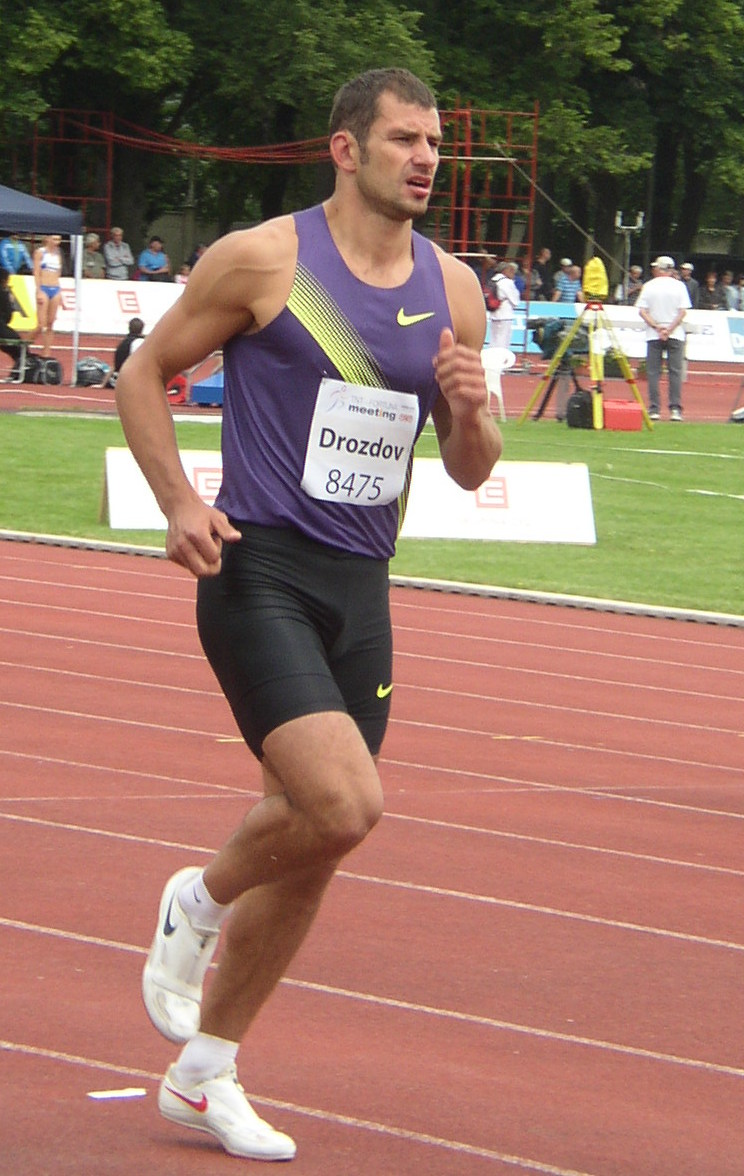
Aleksey Drozdov at the 2010 TNT – Fortuna Meeting in Kladno

Aleksey Vasiliyevich Drozdov (Russian: Алексей Васильевич Дроздов, IPA: [ɐlʲɪkˈsʲej vɐˈsʲilʲjɪvʲɪdʑ drɐzˈdof]; born 3 December 1983) is a Russian decathlete born in Klintsy, Bryansk Oblast.

== International competitions ==
Representing Russia
Year	Competition	Venue	Position	Event	Notes
2003	European U23 Championships	Bydgoszcz, Poland	8th	Decathlon	7348 pts
2005	European U23 Championships	Erfurt, Germany	1st	Decathlon	8196 pts
2005	World Championships	Helsinki, Finland	10th	Decathlon	8038 pts
2006	European Championships	Gothenburg, Sweden	3rd	Decathlon	8350 pts
2008	Olympic Games	Beijing, China	12th	Decathlon	8154 pts
2010	World Indoor Championships	Doha, Qatar	3rd	Heptathlon	6141 pts
2010	European Championships	Barcelona, Spain	7th	Decathlon	8029 pts
2011	World Championships	Daegu, South Korea	4th	Decathlon	8313 pts

== Professional decathlons ==
Year	Competition	Venue	Position	Event	Notes
2005	Décastar	Talence, France	4th	Decathlon	8080 pts
2006	Hypo-Meeting	Götzis, Austria	6th	Decathlon	8188 pts
2007	Hypo-Meeting	Götzis, Austria	4th	Decathlon	8373 pts
2008	Hypo-Meeting	Götzis, Austria	8th	Decathlon	8208 pts
2009	Hypo-Meeting	Götzis, Austria	—	Decathlon	DNF
