= Aleksandr Pogorelov (athlete) =

Russian decathlete

Aleksandr Gennadiyevich Pogorelov (Russian: Александр Геннадьевич Погорелов; born 10 January 1980 in Zheleznogorsk, Kursk Oblast) is a Russian decathlete.

== Career ==
In 2016, he was disqualified from the Beijing 2008 Olympics following reanalysis of his samples from the 2008 Olympics, resulted in a positive test for the prohibited substance turinabol. His results from 23 August 2008 till 29 February 2010 were annulled.

== Achievements ==
Year	Competition	Venue	Position	Notes
Representing Russia
2002	European Championships	Munich, Germany	8th	Decathlon
2003	World Indoor Championships	Birmingham, England	6th	Heptathlon
2003	World Championships	Paris, France	DNF	Decathlon
2004	World Indoor Championships	Budapest, Hungary	6th	Heptathlon
2004	Olympic Games	Athens, Greece	11th	Decathlon
2005	European Indoor Championships	Madrid, Spain	2nd	Heptathlon
2005	Hypo-Meeting	Götzis, Austria	3rd	Decathlon
2005	World Championships	Helsinki, Finland	5th	Decathlon
2005	Décastar	Talence, France	2nd	Decathlon
2006	World Indoor Championships	Moscow, Russia	6th	Heptathlon
2006	European Championships	Gothenburg, Sweden	4th	Decathlon
2007	European Indoor Championships	Birmingham, England	2nd	Heptathlon
2008	Hypo-Meeting	Götzis, Austria	3rd	Decathlon
2008	Olympic Games	Beijing, China	DSQ (4th)	Decathlon
2009	World Championships	Berlin, Germany	DSQ (3rd)	Decathlon
