= Bryan Clay =

American decathlete (born 1980)

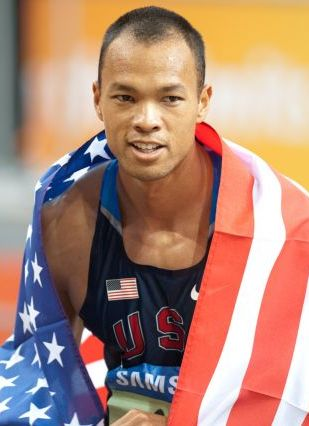
- Clay in 2010

Personal information
- Full name: Bryan Ezra Tsumoru Clay
- Born: January 3, 1980 (age 46) Austin, Texas, United States
- Height: 5 ft 11 in (180 cm)
- Weight: 185 lb (84 kg)

Achievements and titles
- Personal best(s): Decathlon: 8,832 pts (2008); Heptathlon: 6,371 pts (2008)
Medal record
Men's athletics
Representing the United States
Olympic Games
Gold medal – first place	2008 Beijing	Decathlon
Silver medal – second place	2004 Athens	Decathlon
World Championships
Gold medal – first place	2005 Helsinki	Decathlon
World Indoor Championships
Gold medal – first place	2008 Valencia	Heptathlon
Gold medal – first place	2010 Doha	Heptathlon
Silver medal – second place	2006 Moscow	Heptathlon
Silver medal – second place	2004 Budapest	Heptathlon

Bryan Ezra Tsumoru Clay (Japanese: 石井 積, Ishii Tsumoru, born January 3, 1980) is an American decathlete who was the 2008 Summer Olympic champion for the decathlon and was also World champion in 2005.

== Biography ==
Clay was born in Austin, Texas and raised in Hawaii. He is Afro-Asian. His mother, Michele Ishimoto, was a Japanese immigrant to America. His father, Greg Clay, was African-American. His parents divorced when he was in elementary school and he was raised primarily by his mother. He has a younger brother, Nikolas, who was also a standout athlete on the Azusa Pacific University track team. Clay graduated from James B. Castle High School (Kaneohe, Hawaii) in 1998.

On March 23, 2013, Clay was inducted into the Azusa Pacific Hall of Fame in track and field.

Clay is married to Sarah Smith. They have a son, Jacob (born 2005) and two daughters, Katherine (Kate) (born 2007) and Elizabeth (Ellie) (born 2010).

Clay is a devoted Christian. He believes that a balance of mental, physical and emotional health will help him in athletic competition.

== Athletic career ==
He competed in track and field in high school, during which time he was coached by Dacre Bowen and Martin Hee. He then attended Azusa Pacific University, an Evangelical Christian college near Los Angeles, California, where he competed in the National Association of Intercollegiate Athletics and was coached by Mike Barnett, who still coaches him. Clay still trains at Azusa Pacific University. Clay decided to compete in the decathlon after persuasion from Olympian Chris Huffins.

Clay won the silver medal at the 2004 Olympics, and finished first at the 2005 World Championships. He was unable to complete the 2007 World Championships due to injuries, dropping out after four events in which he claimed the competition's best scores in the 100 metres and the long jump.

Clay won the gold medal at the 2008 Olympics in the decathlon. His victory margin of 240 points in the 2008 Beijing Olympics was the largest since 1972. The Olympic decathlon champion is referred to as the "World's Greatest Athlete" and prior to the Olympics, Clay was tested by SPARQ to establish his SPARQ Rating across a number of different sports. The test is meant to measure sport-specific athleticism and in the football test Clay recorded a score of 130.40, the highest ever recorded up to that point. By comparison, Reggie Bush scored a 93.38 on the popular test.

He is one of two Olympians featured on a special edition post-Beijing Olympics Wheaties cereal box; the other was gymnast Nastia Liukin.

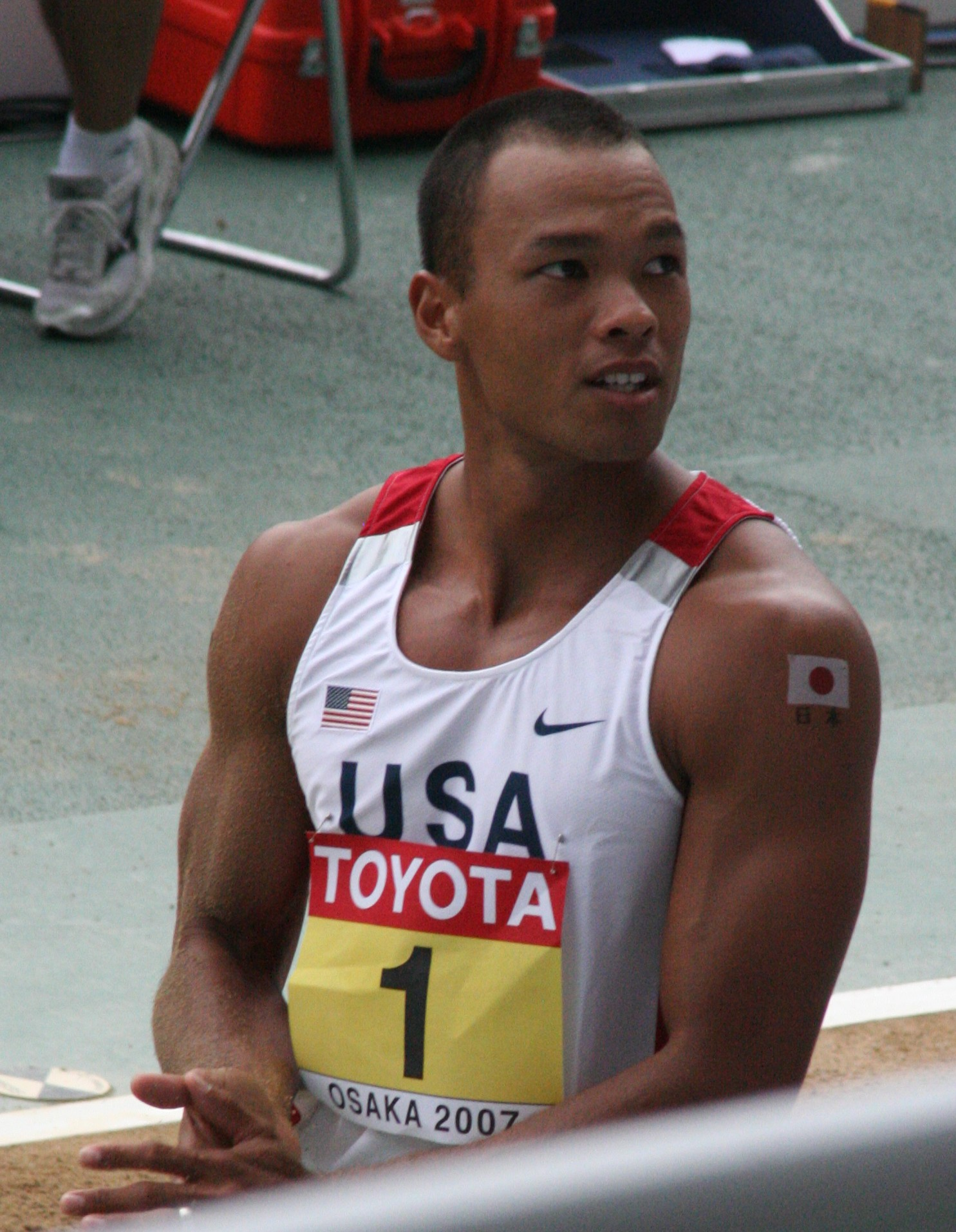
Bryan Clay during the 2007 World Athletics Championships in Osaka, Japan.

His attempts to regain his World Championships decathlon title were thwarted by a hamstring injury in June 2009. This caused him to drop out of the US trials; thus, he missed the chance to compete at the 2009 World Championships in Berlin. He returned to action in 2010 and won the men's heptathlon at the 2010 IAAF World Indoor Championships. At the start of his outdoor season he won the 2010 Hypo-Meeting, holding off the challenge from Romain Barras.

In 2012, Clay had returned to the Olympic Trials in hopes of making a third Olympics and defending his title. Defending the title was a feat only achieved twice, by Bob Mathias and by Daley Thompson. That attempt was quashed at the beginning of the second day, when he tripped over the 9th hurdle in the 110 metres hurdles, then off balance pushed over the tenth hurdle. He was initially disqualified for pushing over the hurdle, but that decision was reversed, allowing him a mark for running 16.81 s, last in the field and over 1.5 s slower than the next best competitor. Thinking he had been disqualified in the hurdles, Clay followed the hurdle accident with three straight fouls in the discus throws, but he still completed the competition.

== Achievements ==
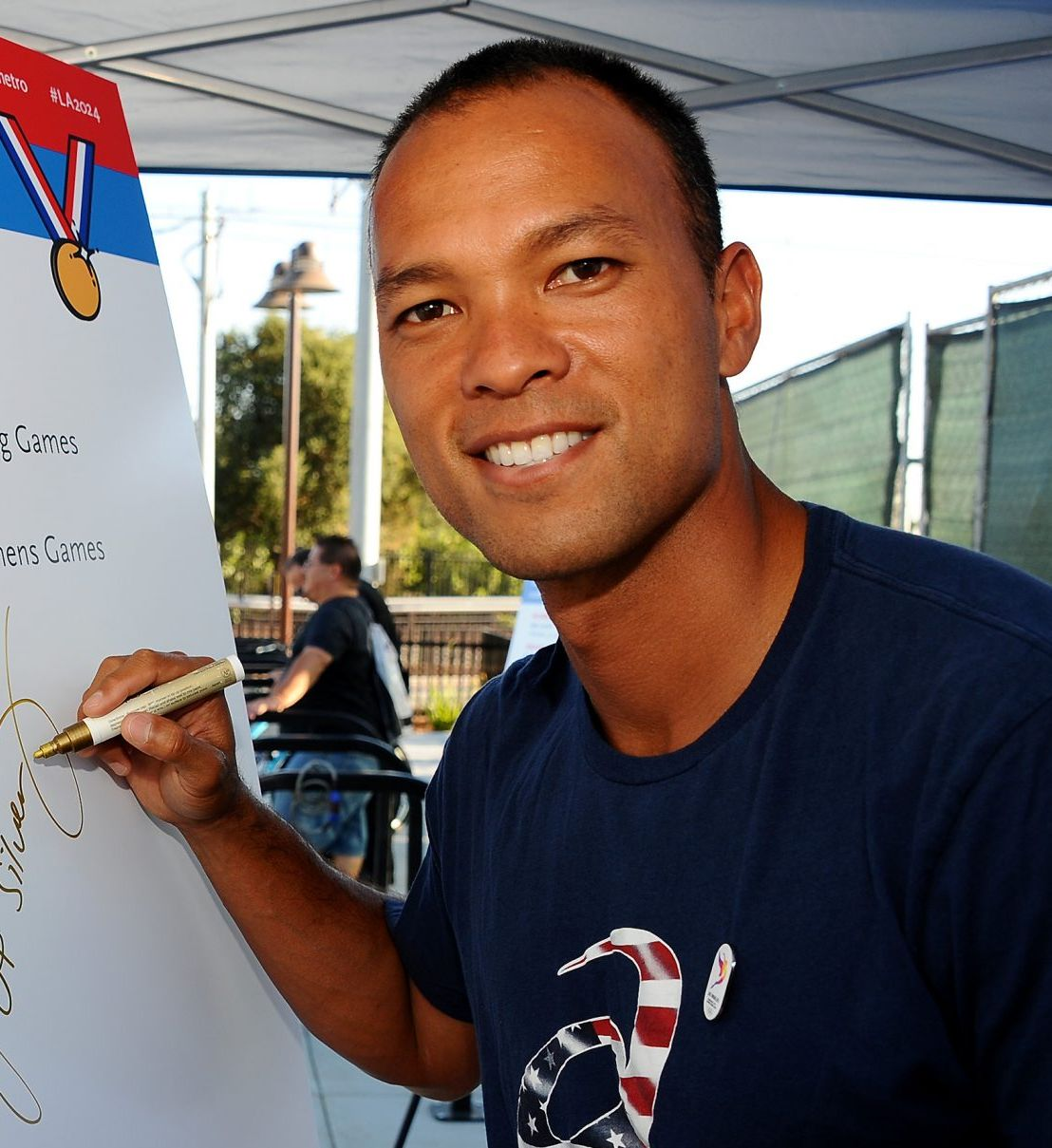
Bryan Clay in 2016

- 2010 IAAF World Indoor Championships - gold medal
- Athletics at the 2008 Summer Olympics – Men's decathlon - gold medal
- 2008 IAAF World Indoor Championships - gold medal
- 2005 World Championships in Athletics - gold medal
- Athletics at the 2004 Summer Olympics – Men's decathlon - silver medal
- 2004 World Indoor Championships - silver medal

== Personal bests ==
Outdoor

Individual events
Event	Performance	Location	Date
100 metres	10.39 (+1.9 m/s)	Azusa	April 10, 2004
100 metres	10.38 (+2.3 m/s)	São Paulo	May 22, 2008
200 metres	21.34 (−0.7 m/s)	Azusa	April 9, 2005
400 metres	47.28	Tampa	May 16, 1998
110 metres hurdles	13.64 (−0.3 m/s)	Los Angeles	May 8, 2010
Long jump	7.81 m (25 ft 7 1/4 in) (+1.5 m/s)	Carson	June 1, 2003
Long jump	8.06 m (26 ft 5 1/4 in) (+4.5 m/s)	Chula Vista	June 6, 2004
High jump	1.95 m (6 ft 4 3/4 in)	Kingston	May 7, 2005
Pole vault	4.85 m (15 ft 10 3/4 in)	Azusa	April 8, 2006
Shot put	15.45 m (50 ft 8 1/4 in)	La Jolla	June 17, 2004
Discus throw	55.06 m (180 ft 7 1/2 in)	Carson	May 18, 2008
Javelin throw	71.64 m (235 ft 1/4 in)	Claremont	April 7, 2007

Combined events
Event	Performance	Location	Date	Score
Decathlon	—N/a	Eugene	June 29–30, 2008	8,832 points
100 meters	10.27 (+0.2 m/s)	Götzis	May 29, 2010	1,011 points
Long jump	7.96 m (26 ft 1 1/4 in) (+0.2 m/s)	Athens	August 23, 2004	1,076 points
Shot put	16.27 m (53 ft 4 1/2 in)	Beijing	August 21, 2008	868 points
High jump	2.09 m (6 ft 10 1/4 in)	Götzis	May 26, 2007	887 points
400 meters	47.85	Palo Alto	June 21, 2003	916 points
110 meters hurdles	13.74 (+1.3 m/s)	Götzis	May 28, 2006	1,008 points
Discus throw	55.87 m (183 ft 3 1/2 in)	Carson	June 24, 2005	993 points
Pole vault	5.10 m (16 ft 8 3/4 in)	Sacramento	July 17, 2004	941 points
Javelin throw	72.00 m (236 ft 2 1/2 in)	Helsinki	August 10, 2005	920 points
1500 meters	4:38.93	Eugene	June 22, 2001	687 points
Virtual Best Performance				9,300 points

Indoor

Individual events
Event	Performance	Location	Date	Ref.
200 meters	21.34	Azusa	February 17, 2001	
Shot put	15.24 m (50 ft 0 in)	New York City	January 28, 2011	

Combined events
Event	Performance	Location	Date	Score
Heptathlon	—N/a	Valencia	March 8–9, 2008	6,371 points
60 meters	6.65	Budapest	March 6, 2004	1,010 points
Long jump	7.74 m (25 ft 4 1/2 in)	Moscow	March 11, 2006	995 points
Shot put	16.21 m (53 ft 2 in)	Valencia	March 8, 2008	864 points
High jump	2.10 m (6 ft 10 1/2 in)	Moscow	March 11, 2006	896 points
60 meters hurdles	7.77	Albuquerque	February 27, 2010	1,040 points
Pole vault	5.10 m (16 ft 8 3/4 in)	Ames	February 15, 2008	957 points
1000 meters	2:49.41	Budapest	March 7, 2004	772 points
Virtual Best Performance				6,534 points

== Politics ==
Clay spoke at the Republican National Convention in 2008.

== See also ==
- List of Olympic decathlon medalists
- Black conservatism in the United States
