= Roman Šebrle =

Czech high jumper and decathlete

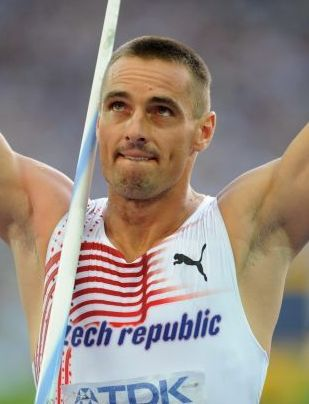
- Šebrle in 2009

Personal information
- Nationality: Czech Republic
- Born: 26 November 1974 (age 51) Lanškroun, Czechoslovakia
- Height: 186 cm (6 ft 1 in)
- Weight: 88 kg (194 lb)

Sport
- Country: Czech Republic
- Sport: Track and field
- Events: Decathlon, heptathlon
- Club: Dukla Prague
- Retired: 2013

Achievements and titles
- Personal bests: Decathlon: 9,026 points (2001); Heptathlon: 6,438 points (2004)
Medal record
Representing Czech Republic
Event	1st	2nd	3rd
Olympic Games	1	1	0
World Championships	1	2	0
World Indoor Championships	2	0	3
European Championships	2	0	0
European Indoor Championships	3	1	2
Total	9	4	5
Men's athletics
Olympic Games
Gold medal – first place	2004 Athens	Decathlon
Silver medal – second place	2000 Sydney	Decathlon
World Championships
Gold medal – first place	2007 Osaka	Decathlon
Silver medal – second place	2003 Paris	Decathlon
Silver medal – second place	2005 Helsinki	Decathlon
World Indoor Championships
Gold medal – first place	2001 Lisbon	Heptathlon
Gold medal – first place	2004 Budapest	Heptathlon
Bronze medal – third place	1999 Maebashi	Heptathlon
Bronze medal – third place	2003 Birmingham	Heptathlon
Bronze medal – third place	2006 Moscow	Heptathlon
European Championships
Gold medal – first place	2002 Munich	Decathlon
Gold medal – first place	2006 Gothenburg	Decathlon
European Indoor Championships
Gold medal – first place	2002 Vienna	Heptathlon
Gold medal – first place	2005 Madrid	Heptathlon
Gold medal – first place	2007 Birmingham	Heptathlon
Silver medal – second place	2000 Ghent	Heptathlon
Bronze medal – third place	2009 Torino	Heptathlon
Bronze medal – third place	2011 Paris	Heptathlon
Universiade
Gold medal – first place	1997 Catania	Decathlon

Roman Šebrle (Czech pronunciation: [ˈroman ˈʃɛbr̩lɛ]; born 26 November 1974) is a Czech retired decathlete. He is considered to be one of the best decathlon athletes of all time. Originally a high jumper, he later switched to the combined events and is a former world record holder in the decathlon, holding the record for over eleven years. In 2001 in Götzis he became the first decathlete ever to achieve over 9,000 points, setting the record at 9,026 points, succeeding his compatriot, Tomáš Dvořák, who had scored 8,994 points two years earlier.

After placing second in the decathlon during the 2000 Summer Olympics, Šebrle won the gold medal in the 2004 Summer Olympics. Tradition dictates the winner of the decathlon holds the title of "World's Greatest Athlete".

A panel of experts convened by the Wall Street Journal in 2008 also ranked Šebrle as the world's greatest athlete. That very same year, Šebrle finished 6th in the decathlon in the Beijing Olympics.

== Private life ==
Šebrle was born on 26 November 1974 in Lanškroun, Czechoslovakia. He studied at František Martin Pelcl Gymnasium in Rychnov nad Kněžnou and at Gymnasium Pardubice. Then he studied an extension course of Information Science and Computer Technology.

On 14 October 2000 Šebrle married Eva Kasalová, a former Czech athlete who competed on the track in the 400 and 800 metres. Their son, Štěpán, a professional footballer, was born on 4 September 2002 and their daughter Kateřina on 30 January 2006.

== Sporting career ==
=== Beginning ===
When Roman Šebrle was six years old, he started playing football, but also occasionally took part in athletics competitions. In 1987 he broke his calf bone and shin bone on one leg in a collision with the opponent goalkeeper during a football match. After this incident he had his leg in plaster for 2 months and spent one year learning to walk.

He competed in his first decathlon competition in 1991 in Týniště nad Orlicí, reaching 5,187 points. Then he met coach Jiří Čechák who convinced him to change school from Rychnov nad Kněžnou to Pardubice, where he joined the Track and Field Club in 1992. He improved his decathlon personal best to 7642 points, although he did just light training.

=== TJ Dukla Praha ===
In 1995 he started his two-year compulsory military service in the Czech Armed Forces. He joined the army sports club Dukla Prague and its group of decathletes led by coach Zdeněk Váňa, and has stayed a member since that time. Thus he is still automatically a soldier of the Czech army, although in fact he does not take part in any military operations or, with a few exceptions, in any military training.

=== Achievements ===
In 1996 Šebrle achieved a score of over 8,000 points for the first time, reaching 8,210 points at a meeting in Prague. His first big success came in 1997, when he won the World University Games in Sicily and came ninth at the World Championships in Athens. In 1999 he was successful at the World Indoor Championships in Maebashi, where he won bronze in the heptathlon, and one year later at the European Indoor Athletics Championships in Ghent, where he took silver.

By the end of the discus discipline at the 2000 Olympic Games in Sydney, after Estonian Erki Nool was red-flagged three times by the discus judge, it seemed that Roman Šebrle was on course for the gold medal. However, the competition referee overruled the decision and Šebrle finally took silver.

In March 2001 he won the first major tournament – the World Indoor Championships in Lisbon – and in May he shocked the world with a new world record of 9,026 points at the Hypo-Meeting in Götzis, marking the first time a decathlete has ever broken the illustrious 9,000 point barrier. However, due to an injury he couldn't do himself justice and finished a disappointed 10th in the World Championships in Edmonton.

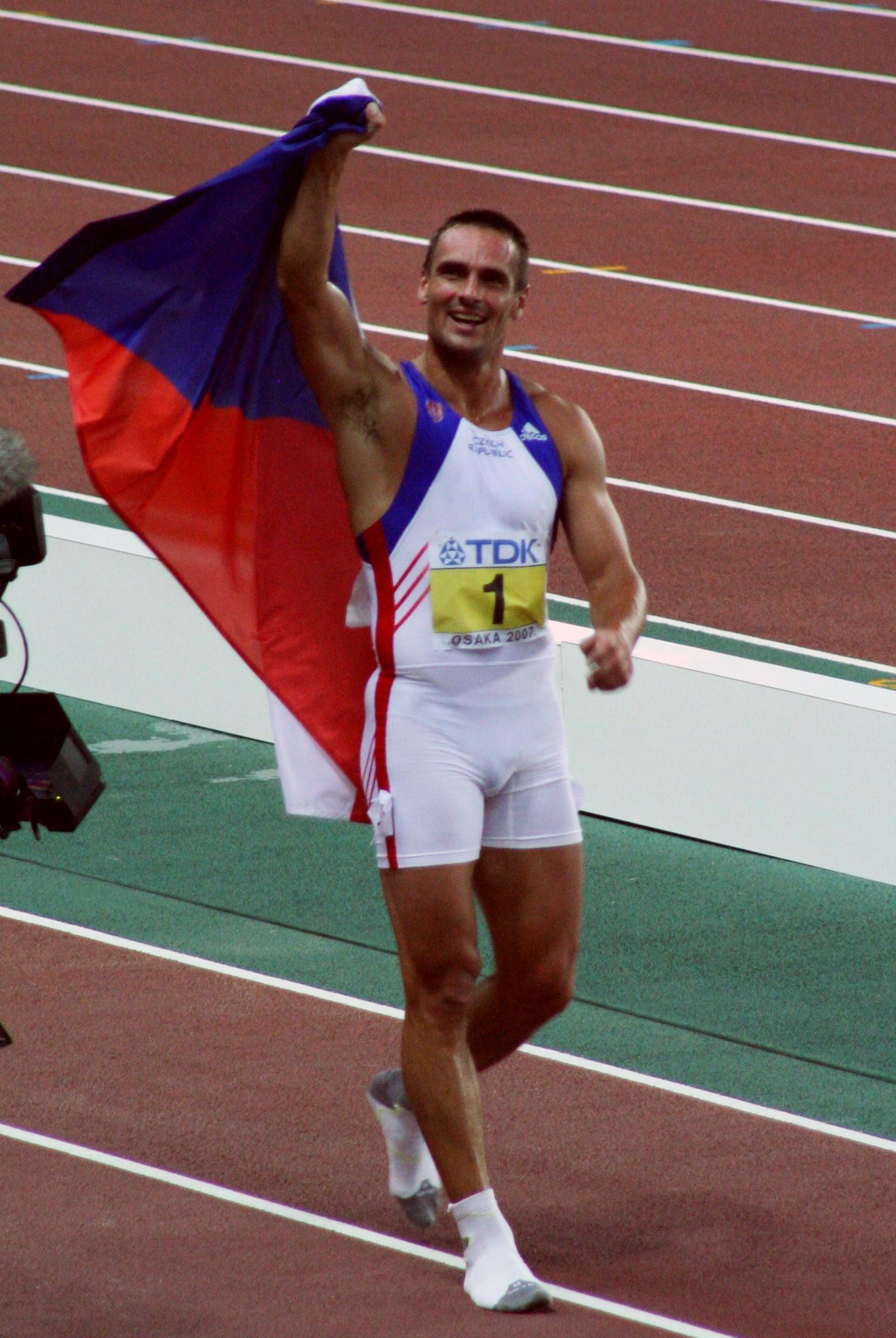
Šebrle celebrates at Osaka, 2007

Šebrle then left the Váňa's group and started to train with coach Dalibor Kupka in the same club. In 2002 he won both European Indoor Championships in Vienna and European Championships in Munich. In 2004 in Athens he finally won the Olympic Games, reaching 8,893 points and thus beating the 20-year-old Olympic record set by the British decathlete Daley Thompson in the 1984 Olympics in Los Angeles. After the victory in Athens, the Czech minister of defence promoted him to the rank of major.

Šebrle's best World Championships results were gold in 2007 (Osaka) and silver in 2003 (Paris) and 2005 (Helsinki). He was also successful at the World Indoor Championships in heptathlon, taking gold in 2001 (Lisbon) and 2004 (Budapest, beating the European record with 6,438 points), and bronze in 1999 (Maebashi), 2003 (Birmingham) and 2006 (Moscow). In 2005 he won the European Indoor Championships in heptathlon (Madrid), in 2006 the European Championships in decathlon for the second time (Gothenburg) and in 2007 he got his third European indoor gold (Birmingham).

The sum of his personal bests in individual disciplines is 9,326 points (the third ever best after Dan O'Brien and Mike Smith). He is the only decathlete who finished 40 decathlon competitions with the score over 8,000 points and 20 competitions with the score over 8,500 points (as of October 2007). Šebrle was also voted the Best Czech Athlete of the Year five times in a row (2002–2006), and in 2004 he received the title of the Czech Sportsman of the Year. In 2002 he received the Guth-Jarkovský Trophy for his world record, which is awarded by the Czech Olympic Committee for the best performance by a Czech athlete achieved during the previous year.

=== Javelin injury ===
On 22 January 2007, Šebrle was hurt by a javelin thrown by a South African female javelin thrower, Sunette Viljoen, from a distance of 55 metres while training in South Africa. The javelin pierced the edge of his right shoulder from the front, 12 cm deep. Shocked, Šebrle ripped the javelin out immediately, which could have caused even more damage. It did not cause any serious injury however, because it slipped between a muscle and his skin. He was taken to a hospital, but left soon with just eleven stitches. However, he was limited in training for some time, especially in the pole vault. Later he stated that he was only 20 cm away from being killed and 1 cm from an injury that would have ended his career.

=== Personal bests ===
Information from World Athletics profile unless otherwise noted.

=== Outdoor ===
As of 10 July 2025

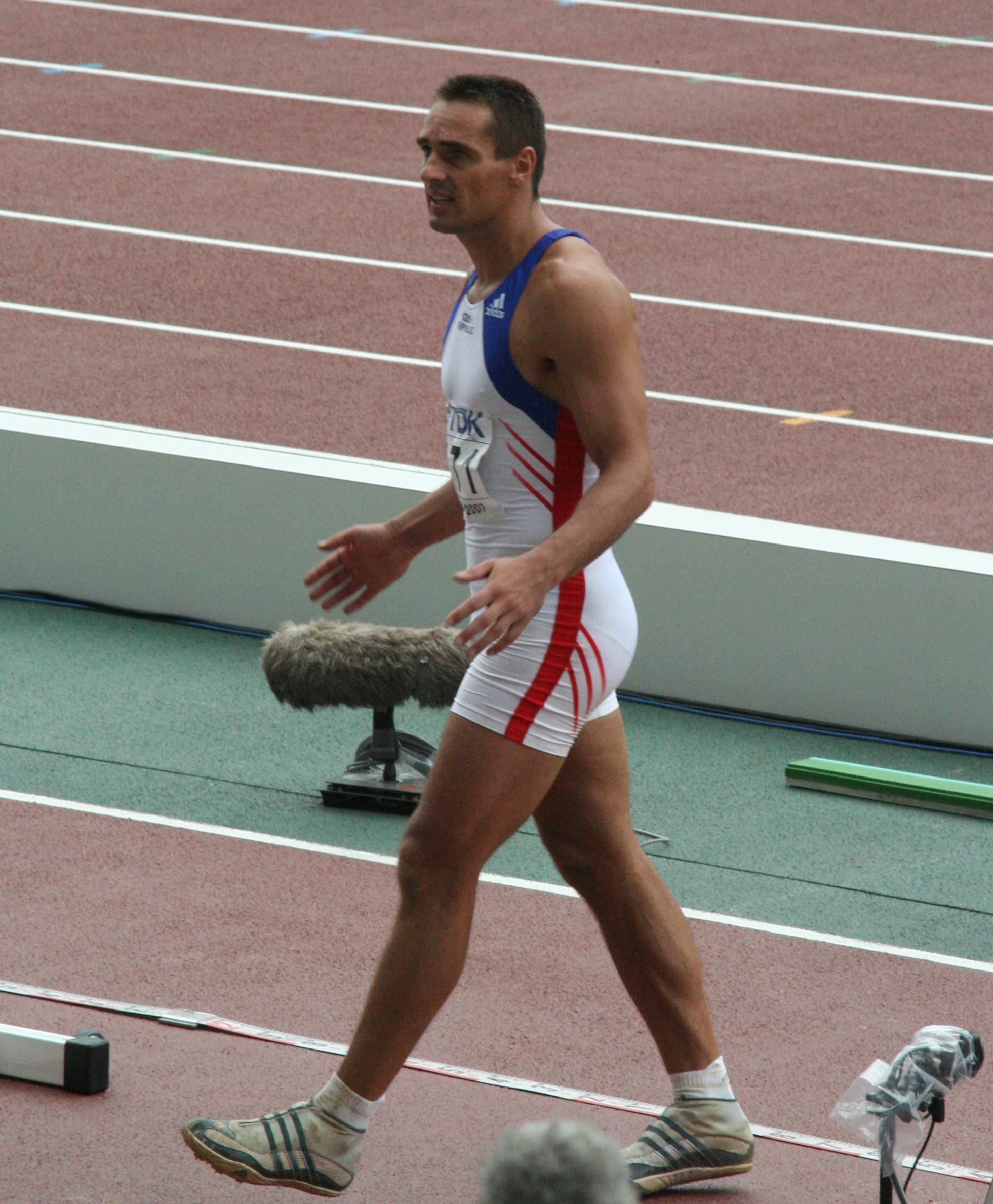
Roman Šebrle in Osaka, 2007

Event	Performance	Location	Date
Long jump	7.87 m (25 ft 9 3/4 in) (+1.8 m/s)	Prague	5 June 1999
Long jump	8.04 m (26 ft 4 1/2 in) (+2.1 m/s)	Thum	20 May 2001
High jump	2.09 m (6 ft 10 1/4 in)	Schleswig	9 May 1999
Pole vault	5.20 m (17 ft 1/2 in)	Turnov	18 May 2003
100 metres	10.92 (+0.6 m/s)	Linz	2 August 2004
200 metres	21.74 (+1.4 m/s)	Prague	7 August 2004
300 metres	35.12	Prague	13 June 2005
110 metres hurdles	13.79 (+0.3 m/s)	Ostrava	27 June 1999
110 metres hurdles	13.68 (+2.6 m/s)	Thum	20 May 2001
Shot put	16.19 m (53 ft 1 1/4 in)	Pardubice	3 August 2006
Discus throw	49.46 m (162 ft 3 in)	Prague	24 May 2009
Javelin throw	66.19 m (217 ft 1 3/4 in)	Villeneuve d'Ascq	8 June 2007

Event	Performance	Location	Date	Points
Decathlon	—N/a	Götzis	26–26 May 2001	9,026 points
100 meters	10.64 (+1.3 m/s)	Götzis	3 June 2000	942 points
Long jump	8.11 m (26 ft 7 1/4 in) (+1.9 m/s)	Götzis	26 May 2001	1,089 points
Shot put	16.47 m (54 ft 1/4 in)	Kladno	20 June 2007	880 points
High jump	2.15 m (7 ft 1/2 in)	Götzis	3 June 2000	944 points
400 meters	47.76	Götzis	29 May 1999	921 points
110 meters hurdles	13.87 (-1.4 m/s)	Sydney	28 September 2000	991 points
Discus throw	49.12 m (161 ft 1 3/4 in)	Arles	4 June 2006	852 points
Pole vault	5.10 m (16 ft 8 3/4 in)	Munich	8 August 2002	941 points
Javelin throw	71.18 m (233 ft 6 1/4 in)	Osaka	1 September 2007	907 points
1500 meters	4:21.98	Götzis	27 May 2001	798 points
Virtual Best Performance				9,265 points

=== Indoor ===
As of 10 July 2025

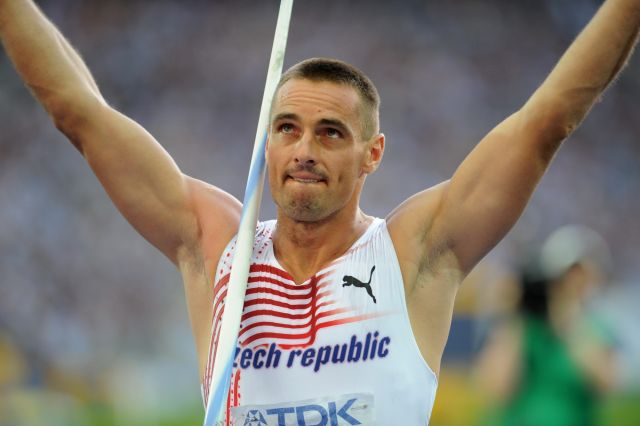
Šebrle competing at the 2009 Berlin World Championships

Event	Performance	Location	Date
Long jump	7.88 m (25 ft 10 in)	Prague	13 February 2000
High jump	2.10 m (6 ft 10 1/2 in)	Prague	15 February 1997
Pole vault	5.00 m (16 ft 4 3/4 in)	Prague	21 February 2004
60 metres	7.01	Chemnitz	22 February 2002
200 metres	22.78	Belfast	18 February 2007
50 metres hurdles	6.79	Reykjavík	24 January 1999
60 metres hurdles	7.84	Prague	12 February 2000
Shot put	15.96 m (52 ft 4 1/4 in)	Germiston	25 January 2002

Event	Performance	Location	Date	Points
Heptathlon	—N/a	Budapest	6–7 March 2004	6,438 points
60 meters	6.91	Tallinn	6 February 1999	915 points
Long jump	7.97 m (26 ft 1 3/4 in)	Tallinn	29 January 2000	1,053 points
Shot put	16.28 m (53 ft 4 3/4 in)	Budapest	6 March 2004	869 points
High jump	2.13 m (6 ft 11 3/4 in)	Tallinn	6 February 1999	925 points
60 meters hurdles	7.86	Lisbon	11 March 2001	1,017 points
Pole vault	5.05 m (16 ft 6 3/4 in)	Tallinn	8 February 2004	926 points
1000 meters	2:37.86	Lisbon	11 March 2001	897 points
Virtual Best Performance				6,602 points

=== List of results ===
Year	Competition	Place	Discipline	Points	Note	Result	Ref.
1997	World Championships	Athens	Decathlon	8232		9	
1997	Universiade	Catania	Decathlon	8380		1	
1998	European Indoor Championships	Valencia	Heptathlon	–		DNF	
1998	European Championships	Budapest	Decathlon	8477		6	
1999	World Indoor Championships	Maebashi	Heptathlon	6319		3	
1999	World Championships	Seville	Decathlon	–		DNF	
2000	European Indoor Championships	Ghent	Heptathlon	6271		2	
2000	Olympic Games	Sydney	Decathlon	8606		2	
2001	World Indoor Championships	Lisbon	Heptathlon	6420		1	
2001	World Championships	Edmonton	Decathlon	8174		10	
2002	European Indoor Championships	Vienna	Heptathlon	6280		1	
2002	European Championships	Munich	Decathlon	8800		1	
2003	World Indoor Championships	Birmingham	Heptathlon	6196		3	
2003	World Championships	Paris	Decathlon	8634		2	
2004	World Indoor Championships	Budapest	Heptathlon	6438	ER	1	
2004	Olympic Games	Athens	Decathlon	8893	OR	1	
2005	European Indoor Championships	Madrid	Heptathlon	6232		1	
2005	World Championships	Helsinki	Decathlon	8521		2	
2006	World Indoor Championships	Moscow	Heptathlon	6161		3	
2006	European Championships	Gothenburg	Decathlon	8526		1	
2007	European Indoor Championships	Birmingham	Heptathlon	6196		1	
2007	World Championships	Osaka	Decathlon	8676		1	
2008	World Indoor Championships	Valencia	Heptathlon	–		DNF	
2008	Olympic Games	Beijing	Decathlon	8241		6	
2009	World Championships	Berlin	Decathlon	8266		11	
2011	European Indoor Championships	Paris	Heptathlon	6178		3	
2011	World Championships	Daegu	Decathlon	8069		14	
2012	Olympic Games	London	Decathlon	–		DNF	

Records
Preceded by (Czech Republic) Tomáš Dvořák	Men's decathlon world record holder 27 May 2001 – 23 June 2012	Succeeded by (United States) Ashton Eaton
Preceded by (Czech Republic) Tomáš Dvořák	Men's decathlon European record holder 27 May 2001 – 16 September 2018	Succeeded by (France) Kevin Mayer
Preceded by (Czech Republic) Tomáš Dvořák	Men's heptathlon European record holder 7 March 2004 – 5 March 2017	Succeeded by (France) Kevin Mayer
Awards
Preceded by Pavel Nedvěd	Czech Athlete of the Year; 2004	Succeeded by Jaromír Jágr
