= Satendra Singh =

Satendra Singh may refer to:

- Satendra Singh (doctor), medical doctor at the University College of Medical Sciences, Delhi
- Satendra Singh (politician), former Fijian politician
- Satendra Singh Lohiya, Indian swimmer

== See also ==
- Satinder, an Indian male given name
- Singh, an Indian surname
- Satinder Singh, Indian athlete
- Sutinder Khehar, British-Indian field hockey player
- Sutinder Singh Noor, Indian poet and critic
- Satyendra Singh, Indian cricketer
- Satyendra Singh Jamwal, Indian Navy officer, chief of staff of Southern Naval Command
