= 2009 Asian Athletics Championships – Men's decathlon =

The men's decathlon event at the 2009 Asian Athletics Championships was held at the Guangdong Olympic Stadium on November 12–13.

== Medalists ==
Gold	Silver	Bronze
Hiromasa Tanaka; Japan	Hadi Sepehrzad; Iran	Zhu Hengjun; China

== Results ==
=== 100 metres ===
Wind: Heat 1: +0.9 m/s, Heat 2: +1.6 m/s

Rank	Heat	Name	Nationality	Time	Points	Notes
1	1	Bharatinder Singh	India	10.88	888	
2	1	Hiromasa Tanaka	Japan	10.90	883	
3	2	Hadi Sepehrzad	Iran	11.02	856	F1
4	2	Ali Hazer	Lebanon	11.07	845	F2
5	2	Zhu Hengjun	China	11.09	841	
6	1	Chen Ying-chi	Chinese Taipei	11.14	830	
7	1	Marat Khaydarov	Uzbekistan	11.35	784	
8	2	Rifat Artikov	Uzbekistan	11.40	774	
9	1	Liu Haibo	China	11.45	763	
10	2	Tung Cheng-ying	Chinese Taipei	11.61	730	
11	2	Mohammad Sameer	Sri Lanka	12.12	628	

=== Long jump ===
Rank	Athlete	Nationality	#1	#2	#3	Result	Points	Notes	Overall
1	Bharatinder Singh	India	6.94	7.06	x	7.06	828		1716
2	Liu Haibo	China	6.84w	7.02	6.81	7.02	818		1581
3	Zhu Hengjun	China	6.88	x	6.99	6.99	811		1652
4	Hiromasa Tanaka	Japan	6.94	6.92	6.80	6.94	799		1682
5	Chen Ying-chi	Chinese Taipei	x	6.51	6.87	6.87	783		1613
6	Hadi Sepehrzad	Iran	6.59	6.73w	6.54	6.73w	750		1606
7	Marat Khaydarov	Uzbekistan	6.43	6.52	6.69	6.69	741		1525
8	Rifat Artikov	Uzbekistan	6.62	x	6.57	6.62	725		1499
9	Ali Hazer	Lebanon	6.16	6.60	x	6.60	720		1565
10	Tung Cheng-ying	Chinese Taipei	6.46	5.15	6.43	6.46	688		1418
11	Mohammad Sameer	Sri Lanka	6.26w	6.17	6.17	6.26w	644		1272

=== Shot put ===
Rank	Athlete	Nationality	#1	#2	#3	Result	Points	Notes	Overall
1	Hadi Sepehrzad	Iran	14.18	15.00	14.90	15.00	790		2396
2	Bharatinder Singh	India	12.92	13.05	12.70	13.05	670		2386
3	Liu Haibo	China	12.98	11.97	11.90	12.98	670		2247
4	Hiromasa Tanaka	Japan	12.06	12.21	12.38	12.38	629		2311
5	Tung Cheng-ying	Chinese Taipei	12.29	11.91	x	12.29	624		2042
6	Zhu Hengjun	China	11.88	11.79	11.51	11.88	599		2251
7	Marat Khaydarov	Uzbekistan	11.10	11.72	x	11.72	589		2114
8	Ali Hazer	Lebanon	11.41	x	x	11.41	571		2136
9	Chen Ying-chi	Chinese Taipei	11.35	11.40	x	11.40	570		2183
10	Mohammad Sameer	Sri Lanka	9.01	9.62	9.39	9.62	463		1735
	Rifat Artikov	Uzbekistan	x	x	x	NM	0		1499

=== High jump ===
Rank	Athlete	Nationality	1.75	1.78	1.81	1.84	1.87	1.90	1.93	1.96	1.99	2.02	2.05	2.08	2.11	Result	Points	Notes	Overall
1	Liu Haibo	China	–	–	–	–	–	xo	o	o	o	o	o	xo	xxx	2.08	878		3125
2	Marat Khaydarov	Uzbekistan	–	–	–	o	o	o	xo	o	xxx					1.96	767		2881
3	Rifat Artikov	Uzbekistan	–	–	–	–	xo	o	o	xxo	xxx					1.96	767		2266
4	Zhu Hengjun	China	o	–	o	o	xxo	o	xxx							1.90	714		2965
5	Hadi Sepehrzad	Iran	–	–	xxo	o	xxx									1.84	661		3057
6	Tung Cheng-ying	Chinese Taipei	o	xxo	xxo	xxx										1.81	636		2678
7	Ali Hazer	Lebanon	xo	o	xxx											1.78	610		2746
8	Hiromasa Tanaka	Japan	o	xo	xxx											1.78	610		2921
9	Chen Ying-chi	Chinese Taipei	o	xxx												1.75	585		2768
9	Mohammad Sameer	Sri Lanka	o	xxx												1.75	585		2320
9	Bharatinder Singh	India	o	xxx												1.75	585		2971

=== 400 metres ===
Rank	Lane	Name	Nationality	Time	Points	Notes	Overall
1	1	Ali Hazer	Lebanon	50.31	800		3546
2	2	Hiromasa Tanaka	Japan	50.44	794		3715
3	2	Rifat Artikov	Uzbekistan	51.17	761		3027
4	1	Zhu Hengjun	China	51.23	759		3724
5	1	Marat Khaydarov	Uzbekistan	51.24	758		3639
6	2	Liu Haibo	China	51.37	753		3878
7	1	Hadi Sepehrzad	Iran	51.72	737		3794
8	2	Bharatinder Singh	India	52.71	694		3665
9	2	Chen Ying-chi	Chinese Taipei	53.00	682		3450
10	1	Tung Cheng-ying	Chinese Taipei	53.88	645		3323
11	1	Mohammad Sameer	Sri Lanka	55.62	574		2894

=== 110 metres hurdles ===
Wind: Heat 1: 0.0 m/s, Heat -0.7 m/s

Rank	Lane	Name	Nationality	Time	Points	Notes	Overall
1	2	Zhu Hengjun	China	14.45	917		4641
2	2	Tung Cheng-ying	Chinese Taipei	14.74	881		4204
3	1	Rifat Artikov	Uzbekistan	14.87	865		3892
4	2	Hadi Sepehrzad	Iran	14.88	864		4658
5	1	Bharatinder Singh	India	15.09	839		4504
6	2	Marat Khaydarov	Uzbekistan	15.18	828		4467
7	1	Hiromasa Tanaka	Japan	15.37	805		4520
8	1	Chen Ying-chi	Chinese Taipei	15.43	798		4248
8	2	Mohammad Sameer	Sri Lanka	15.43	798		3692
10	2	Ali Hazer	Lebanon	15.45	796		4342
11	1	Liu Haibo	China	15.52	788		4666

=== Discus throw ===
Rank	Athlete	Nationality	#1	#2	#3	Result	Points	Notes	Overall
1	Hadi Sepehrzad	Iran	41.52	46.11	x	46.11	790		5448
2	Rifat Artikov	Uzbekistan	45.70	45.31	x	45.70	781		4673
3	Hiromasa Tanaka	Japan	43.96	38.96	39.01	43.96	745		5265
4	Bharatinder Singh	India	35.45	15.15	43.67	43.67	740		5244
5	Tung Cheng-ying	Chinese Taipei	x	40.12	41.66	41.66	698		4902
6	Zhu Hengjun	China	34.74	36.66	38.26	38.26	629		5270
7	Chen Ying-chi	Chinese Taipei	37.27	x	35.42	37.27	609		4857
8	Marat Khaydarov	Uzbekistan	34.35	36.69	32.81	36.69	598		5065
9	Mohammad Sameer	Sri Lanka	35.34	34.55	36.43	36.43	592		4284
10	Ali Hazer	Lebanon	x	34.49	35.99	35.99	584		4926
11	Liu Haibo	China	x	x	34.35	34.35	551		5217

=== Pole vault ===
Rank	Athlete	Nationality	3.30	3.40	3.50	3.60	3.70	3.80	3.90	4.00	4.10	4.20	4.40	4.50	4.60	4.70	4.80	4.90	5.00	5.10	Result	Points	Notes	Overall
1	Hiromasa Tanaka	Japan	–	–	–	–	–	–	–	–	–	–	–	o	–	o	–	xxo	o	xxx	5.00	910		6175
2	Rifat Artikov	Uzbekistan	–	–	–	–	–	–	–	–	–	–	–	o	o	o	xxx				4.70	819		5492
3	Zhu Hengjun	China	–	–	–	–	–	–	–	o	–	o	xo	xxx							4.40	731		6001
4	Hadi Sepehrzad	Iran	–	–	–	o	–	o	o	xo	xo	xxx									4.10	645		6093
5	Marat Khaydarov	Uzbekistan	–	–	o	–	xo	o	xo	xxx											3.90	590		5655
6	Tung Cheng-ying	Chinese Taipei	–	–	–	–	–	xo	–	xxx											3.80	562		5464
7	Mohammad Sameer	Sri Lanka	–	o	o	xo	xxo	xo	–	xxx											3.80	562		4846
8	Bharatinder Singh	India	–	o	o	o	o	xxx													3.70	535		5779
9	Ali Hazer	Lebanon	o	o	xo	xxx															3.50	482		5408
	Liu Haibo	China	–	–	–	–	–	–	–	–	–	–	–	DNF							DNF	0		5217
	Chen Ying-chi	Chinese Taipei	–	–	–	DNF															DNF	0		4857

=== Javelin throw ===
Rank	Athlete	Nationality	#1	#2	#3	Result	Points	Notes	Overall
1	Hiromasa Tanaka	Japan	59.82	55.36	x	59.82	735		6924
2	Bharatinder Singh	India	59.29	x	x	59.29	727		6506
3	Zhu Hengjun	China	55.07	57.66	56.54	57.66	703		6704
4	Tung Cheng-ying	Chinese Taipei	51.25	54.69	56.11	56.11	679		6143
5	Hadi Sepehrzad	Iran	46.83	55.73	51.94	55.73	674		6767
6	Mohammad Sameer	Sri Lanka	55.51	53.13	50.90	55.51	671		5517
7	Rifat Artikov	Uzbekistan	x	54.51	53.97	54.51	656		6148
8	Ali Hazer	Lebanon	45.05	x	x	45.05	516		5924
9	Marat Khaydarov	Uzbekistan	43.93	44.59	44.58	44.59	509		6164
	Chen Ying-chi	Chinese Taipei				DNS	0		DNF
	Liu Haibo	China				DNS	0		DNF

=== 1500 metres ===
Rank	Name	Nationality	Time	Points	Notes
1	Hiromasa Tanaka	Japan	4:52.22	605	
2	Marat Khaydarov	Uzbekistan	4:52.26	605	
3	Ali Hazer	Lebanon	5:01.29	552	
4	Rifat Artikov	Uzbekistan	5:05.15	530	
5	Zhu Hengjun	China	5:11.30	496	
6	Hadi Sepehrzad	Iran	5:11.56	495	
7	Tung Cheng-ying	Chinese Taipei	5:19.97	450	
8	Bharatinder Singh	India	5:24.69	426	
	Mohammad Sameer	Sri Lanka	DNS	0	

=== Final standings ===
The highest mark recorded in each event is highlighted in yellow

Rank	Athlete	Nationality	100m	LJ	SP	HJ	400m	110m H	DT	PV	JT	1500m	Points	Notes
1st place, gold medalist(s)	Hiromasa Tanaka	Japan	10.90	6.94	12.38	1.78	50.44	15.37	43.96	5.00	59.82	4:52.22	7515	
2nd place, silver medalist(s)	Hadi Sepehrzad	Iran	11.02	6.73	15.00	1.84	51.72	14.88	46.11	4.10	55.73	5:11.56	7262	SB
3rd place, bronze medalist(s)	Zhu Hengjun	China	11.09	6.99	11.88	1.90	51.23	14.45	38.26	4.40	57.66	5:11.30	7200	
4	Bharatinder Singh	India	10.88	7.06	13.05	1.75	52.71	15.09	43.67	3.70	59.29	5:24.69	6932	
5	Marat Khaydarov	Uzbekistan	11.35	6.69	11.72	1.96	51.24	15.18	36.69	3.90	44.59	4:52.26	6769	
6	Rifat Artikov	Uzbekistan	11.40	6.62	NM	1.96	51.17	14.87	45.70	4.70	54.51	5:05.15	6678	
7	Tung Cheng-ying	Chinese Taipei	11.61	6.46	12.29	1.81	53.88	14.74	41.66	3.80	56.11	5:19.97	6593	
8	Ali Hazer	Lebanon	11.07	6.60	11.41	1.78	50.31	15.45	35.99	3.50	45.05	5:01.29	6476	
	Mohammad Sameer	Sri Lanka	12.12	6.26	9.62	1.75	55.62	15.43	36.43	3.80	55.51	DNS	DNF	
	Liu Haibo	China	11.45	7.02	12.98	2.08	51.37	15.52	34.35	DNF	DNS	–	DNF	
	Chen Ying-chi	Chinese Taipei	11.14	6.87	11.40	1.75	53.00	15.39	37.27	DNF	DNS	–	DNF	
