= 2011 Asian Athletics Championships – Men's decathlon =

The men's decathlon event at the 2011 Asian Athletics Championships took place on July 7–8, 2011 at the Kobe Universiade Memorial Stadium.

== Medalists ==
Gold	Silver	Bronze
Hadi Sepehrzad; Iran	Akihiko Nakamura; Japan	Bharat Inder Singh; India

== Results ==
=== 100 metres ===
Wind: –0.8 m/s

Rank	Lane	Name	Nationality	Time	Points	Notes
1	7	Mohammed Al-Quraya	Saudi Arabia	10.68	933	
2	4	Bharat Inder Singh	India	10.93	876	
3	8	Akihiko Nakamura	Japan	10.95	872	
4	6	Vũ Văn Huyện	Vietnam	11.14	830	
5	2	Hadi Sepehrzad	Iran	11.24	808	
6	3	Abdoljalil Tomaj	Iran	11.26	804	
7	9	Hiromasa Tanaka	Japan	11.31	793	
8	5	Rifat Artikov	Uzbekistan	11.35	784	

=== Long jump ===
Rank	Athlete	Nationality	#1	#2	#3	Result	Points	Notes	Overall
1	Vũ Văn Huyện	Vietnam	7.03	7.28	7.05	7.28	881		1711
2	Akihiko Nakamura	Japan	7.27	7.12	7.11	7.27	878		1750
3	Mohammed Al-Quraya	Saudi Arabia	7.17	x	7.08	7.17	854		1787
4	Abdoljalil Tomaj	Iran	6.77	7.06	x	7.06	828		1632
5	Bharat Inder Singh	India	6.91	6.95	6.90	6.95	802		1678
6	Hiromasa Tanaka	Japan	6.55	6.65	x	6.65	732		1525
7	Hadi Sepehrzad	Iran	6.56	x	6.35	6.56	711		1519
8	Rifat Artikov	Uzbekistan	6.46	5.98	6.41	6.46	688		1472

=== Shot put ===
Rank	Athlete	Nationality	#1	#2	#3	Result	Points	Notes	Overall
1	Hadi Sepehrzad	Iran	15.56	16.37	x	16.37	874		2393
2	Rifat Artikov	Uzbekistan	15.02	x	15.54	15.54	823		2295
3	Bharat Inder Singh	India	14.31	x	14.65	14.65	768		2446
4	Abdoljalil Tomaj	Iran	12.35	12.32	12.85	12.85	658		2290
5	Mohammed Al-Quraya	Saudi Arabia	12.17	12.39	12.77	12.77	653		2440
6	Hiromasa Tanaka	Japan	11.55	11.85	12.50	12.50	637		2162
7	Vũ Văn Huyện	Vietnam	11.34	11.96	x	11.96	604		2315
8	Akihiko Nakamura	Japan	11.30	x	11.40	11.40	570		2320

=== High jump ===
Rank	Athlete	Nationality	1.72	1.75	1.78	1.81	1.84	1.87	1.90	1.93	1.96	1.99	2.02	2.05	Result	Points	Notes	Overall
1	Akihiko Nakamura	Japan	–	–	–	–	–	o	–	xo	o	xo	xo	xxx	2.02	822		3142
2	Abdoljalil Tomaj	Iran	–	–	–	–	–	–	o	–	o	xxx			1.96	767		3057
3	Bharat Inder Singh	India	–	–	–	o	o	xo	o	o	xxx				1.93	740		3186
4	Rifat Artikov	Uzbekistan	–	–	–	–	o	–	o	xxx					1.90	714		3009
5	Vũ Văn Huyện	Vietnam	–	–	–	o	–	–	xo	–	xxx				1.90	714		3029
6	Mohammed Al-Quraya	Saudi Arabia	–	–	–	–	–	xo	xxx						1.87	687		3127
7	Hadi Sepehrzad	Iran	–	o	–	o	o	xxx							1.84	661		3054
8	Hiromasa Tanaka	Japan	o	o	o	o	xxx								1.81	636		2798

=== 400 metres ===
Rank	Lane	Name	Nationality	Time	Points	Notes	Overall
1	4	Akihiko Nakamura	Japan	48.15	902		4044
2	2	Bharat Inder Singh	India	50.86	775		3961
3	6	Hadi Sepehrzad	Iran	51.42	750		3804
4	5	Rifat Artikov	Uzbekistan	51.69	738		3747
5	9	Abdoljalil Tomaj	Iran	52.27	713		3770
6	3	Hiromasa Tanaka	Japan	52.40	707		3505
	8	Mohammed Al-Quraya	Saudi Arabia	DNF	0		3127
	7	Vũ Văn Huyện	Vietnam	DNS	0		3029

=== 110 metres hurdles ===
Wind: +0.3 m/s

Rank	Lane	Name	Nationality	Time	Points	Notes	Overall
1	3	Akihiko Nakamura	Japan	14.50	911		4955
2	8	Hadi Sepehrzad	Iran	14.78	876		4680
3	5	Bharat Inder Singh	India	15.03	846		4807
4	2	Abdoljalil Tomaj	Iran	15.63	775		4545
5	6	Hiromasa Tanaka	Japan	15.80	755		4260
	4	Rifat Artikov	Uzbekistan	DNS	0		3747
	9	Mohammed Al-Quraya	Saudi Arabia	DNS	0		3127

=== Discus throw ===
Rank	Athlete	Nationality	#1	#2	#3	Result	Points	Notes	Overall
1	Hadi Sepehrzad	Iran	42.63	53.18	48.89	53.18	937		5617
2	Bharat Inder Singh	India	x	43.53	43.80	43.80	742		5549
3	Hiromasa Tanaka	Japan	42.93	x	x	42.93	724		4984
4	Abdoljalil Tomaj	Iran	37.67	39.45	x	39.45	653		5198
5	Akihiko Nakamura	Japan	27.78	28.48	x	28.48	435		5390

=== Pole vault ===
Rank	Athlete	Nationality	3.50	3.60	3.70	3.80	3.90	4.00	4.10	4.20	4.30	4.40	4.50	4.60	4.70	Result	Points	Notes	Overall
1	Hiromasa Tanaka	Japan	–	–	–	–	–	–	–	–	–	xo	–	o	xxx	4.60	790		5774
2	Akihiko Nakamura	Japan	–	–	–	–	–	–	–	xo	o	xo	o	xxx		4.50	760		6150
3	Hadi Sepehrzad	Iran	–	–	–	xo	–	o	–	xo	o	xxx				4.30	702		6319
4	Bharat Inder Singh	India	–	–	–	xo	–	o	–	xo	o	xxx				4.10	645		6194
5	Abdoljalil Tomaj	Iran	xxo	–	–	xo	–	xxx								3.80	562		5760

=== Javelin throw ===
Rank	Athlete	Nationality	#1	#2	#3	Result	Points	Notes	Overall
1	Bharat Inder Singh	India	54.27	59.46	x	59.46	730		6924
2	Hiromasa Tanaka	Japan	x	50.34	58.34	58.34	713		6487
3	Hadi Sepehrzad	Iran	50.29	51.99	x	51.99	618		6937
4	Abdoljalil Tomaj	Iran	x	45.53	x	45.53	523		6283
5	Akihiko Nakamura	Japan	43.80	44.55	42.65	44.55	508		6658

=== 1500 metres ===
Rank	Name	Nationality	Time	Points	Notes
1	Akihiko Nakamura	Japan	4:18.84	820	
2	Hadi Sepehrzad	Iran	4:58.34	569	
3	Bharat Inder Singh	India	5:23.04	434	
4	Hiromasa Tanaka	Japan	5:47.81	316	
	Abdoljalil Tomaj	Iran	DNF	0	

=== Final standings ===
The highest mark recorded in each event is highlighted in yellow

Rank	Athlete	Nationality	100m	LJ	SP	HJ	400m	110m H	DT	PV	JT	1500m	Points	Notes
1st place, gold medalist(s)	Hadi Sepehrzad	Iran	11.24	6.56	16.37	1.84	51.42	14.78	53.18	4.30	51.99	4:58.34	7506	
2nd place, silver medalist(s)	Akihiko Nakamura	Japan	10.95	7.27	11.40	2.02	48.15	14.50	28.48	4.50	44.55	4:18.84	7478	
3rd place, bronze medalist(s)	Bharat Inder Singh	India	10.93	6.95	14.65	1.93	50.86	15.03	43.80	4.10	59.46	5:23.04	7358	
4	Hiromasa Tanaka	Japan	11.31	6.65	12.50	1.81	52.40	15.80	42.93	4.60	58.34	5:47.81	6803	
5	Abdoljalil Tomaj	Iran	11.26	7.06	12.85	1.96	52.27	15.63	39.45	3.80	45.53	DNF	6283	
	Rifat Artikov	Uzbekistan	11.35	6.46	15.54	1.90	51.69	DNS	–	–	–	–	DNF	
	Mohammed Al-Quraya	Saudi Arabia	10.68	7.17	12.77	1.87	DNF	DNS	–	–	–	–	DNF	
	Vũ Văn Huyện	Vietnam	11.14	7.28	11.96	1.90	DNS	–	–	–	–	–	DNF	
