= Satinder =

Satinder is a given name and may refer to:

== People ==
- Satinder Bhagat, originator of the zero-rupee note
- Satinder Bindra, Canadian television news reporter
- Satinder Kumar Lambah (born 1941), former Indian High Commissioner to Pakistan
- Satinder Kumar Saini, Indian Army officer
- Satinder Sartaaj (born 1982), singer, songwriter, actor, and poet
- Satinder Satti, Indian television anchor, actress, poet, dancer, and singer
- Satinder Singh (born 1987), Indian 400-meter hurdler
- Satinder Singh Noor, Punjabi poet and critic
- Satinder Vir Kessar (born 1932), Indian synthetic organic chemist
