= 2013 Asian Athletics Championships – Men's decathlon =

The men's decathlon at the 2013 Asian Athletics Championships was held at the Shree Shiv Chhatrapati Sports Complex on 3–4 July.

== Results ==
The highest mark recorded in each event is highlighted in yellow

Rank	Athlete	Nationality	100m	LJ	SP	HJ	400m	110m H	DT	PV	JT	1500m	Points	Notes
1st place, gold medalist(s)	Dmitriy Karpov	Kazakhstan	11.01	7.01	16.18	1.98	49.36	14.46	50.27	5.10	48.40	4:57.56	8037	CR
2nd place, silver medalist(s)	Akihiko Nakamura	Japan	10.83	7.29	11.77	2.07	48.29	14.81	31.28	4.60	44.81	4:19.10	7620	
3rd place, bronze medalist(s)	Leonid Andreev	Uzbekistan	11.23	7.14	15.11	1.92	51.14	15.25	43.56	4.70	54.64	5:29.46	7383	
4	Abdoljalil Toomaj	Iran	10.99	6.99	13.48	2.01	51.11	15.22	44.11	4.00	57.52	5:19.63	7290	
5	Daya Ram	India	11.49	6.51	13.22	1.78	54.58	15.23	41.34	4.50	49.71	5:13.40	6705	
6	Dileep Kumar	India	11.42	6.48	10.44	1.87	51.65	15.59	31.91	4.00	53.49	4:52.52	6544	
7	Jesson Ramil Cid	Philippines	11.08	6.81	9.54	1.84	50.39	15.58	29.36	3.60	44.82	4:44.66	6433	
8	Khalaf Al-Mala	Syria	11.41	6.60	10.71	1.75	50.80	16.26	34.34	4.00	45.11	5:27.82	6180	
	Nguyễn Văn Huệ	Vietnam	11.25	6.94	11.18	1.86	52.26	15.68	NM	4.60	DNS	–	DNF	
	Hadi Sepehrzad	Iran	11.27	6.38	15.76	1.92	51.83	DNF	NM	DNS	–	–	DNF	
	Ali Hazer	Lebanon	11.37	6.54	11.41	1.72	49.97	DNS	–	–	–	–	DNF	
	Bharatinder Singh	India	10.71	7.32	15.00	1.84	DNS	–	–	–	–	–	DNF	
