= 2011 Asian Athletics Championships – Men's 400 metres hurdles =

The men's 400 metres hurdles at the 2011 Asian Athletics Championships was held at the Kobe Universiade Memorial Stadium on the 8 and 9 of July.

== Medalists ==
Gold	Takatoshi Abe; Japan
Silver	Yuta Imazeki; Japan
Bronze	Chieh Chen; Chinese Taipei

== Records ==
2011 Asian Athletics Championships
World record	Kevin Young (USA)	46.78	Barcelona, Spain	6 August 1992
Asian record	Hadi Soua'an Al-Somaily (KSA)	47.53	Sydney, Australia	27 September 2000
Championship record	Mubarak Al-Nubi (QAT)	48.67	Colombo, Sri Lanka	2002

=== Round 1 ===
First 3 in each heat (Q) and 2 best performers (q) advanced to the Final.

Rank	Heat	Name	Nationality	Time	Notes
1	1	Takatoshi Abe	Japan	50.41	Q
2	2	Takayuki Kishimoto	Japan	50.50	Q
3	1	Yuta Imazeki	Japan	50.78	Q
4	2	Chieh Chen	Chinese Taipei	50.81	Q
5	2	Joseph Abraham	India	50.94	Q
6	1	Satinder Singh	India	50.95	Q
7	2	Lee Seung-Yoon	South Korea	51.05	q
8	1	Hassan Aman Salmeen	Qatar	51.38	q, PB
9	2	Abdullah Al-Hidi	Oman	51.64	
10	2	Dmitriy Komkov	Kazakhstan	52.52	
11	1	Andrian Andrian	Indonesia	52.83	PB
12	2	Chen Yu-Te	Chinese Taipei	52.89	
13	1	Fawaz Al-Shammari	Kuwait	58.76	

=== Final ===
Rank	Lane	Name	Nationality	Time	Notes
1st place, gold medalist(s)	6	Takatoshi Abe	Japan	49.64	SB
2nd place, silver medalist(s)	4	Yuta Imazeki	Japan	50.22	
3rd place, bronze medalist(s)	5	Chieh Chen	Chinese Taipei	50.39	
4	9	Joseph Abraham	India	50.82	
5	3	Lee Seung-Yoon	South Korea	51.40	
6	8	Satinder Singh	India	51.93	
	2	Hassan Aman Salmeen	Qatar	DQ	FS
	7	Takayuki Kishimoto	Japan	DQ	FS
