= Athletics at the 2010 Asian Games – Men's decathlon =

Men's decathlon at the 2010 Asian Games
- Venue: Aoti Main Stadium
- Dates: 24–25 November 2010
- Competitors: 10 from 9 nations

Medalists
gold medal	Dmitriy Karpov	Kazakhstan
silver medal	Kim Kun-woo	South Korea
bronze medal	Vũ Văn Huyện	Vietnam

The men's decathlon event at the 2010 Asian Games was held at the Aoti Main Stadium, Guangzhou, China on 24–25 November.

== Schedule ==
All times are China Standard Time (UTC+08:00)

Date	Time	Event
Wednesday, 24 November 2010	09:00	100 metres
Wednesday, 24 November 2010	09:40	Long jump
Wednesday, 24 November 2010	11:00	Shot put
Wednesday, 24 November 2010	17:05	High jump
Wednesday, 24 November 2010	19:25	400 metres
Thursday, 25 November 2010	09:00	110 metres hurdles
Thursday, 25 November 2010	09:40	Discus throw
Thursday, 25 November 2010	11:00	Pole vault
Thursday, 25 November 2010	17:00	Javelin throw
Thursday, 25 November 2010	19:30	1500 metres

== Records ==
Prior to this competition, the existing world, Asian and Games records were as follows.

World Record	Roman Šebrle (CZE)	9026	Götzis, Austria	27 May 2001
Asian Record	Dmitriy Karpov (KAZ)	8725	Athens, Greece	24 August 2004
Games Record	Dmitriy Karpov (KAZ)	8384	Doha, Qatar	11 December 2006

== Results ==
Legend

- DNF — Did not finish
- DNS — Did not start

=== 100 metres ===
- Wind – Heat 1: +1.3 m/s
- Wind – Heat 2: +1.6 m/s

Rank	Heat	Athlete	Time	Points	Notes
1	1	Mohammed Al-Qaree (KSA)	10.76	915	
1	2	Vũ Văn Huyện (VIE)	10.76	915	
3	2	Hadi Sepehrzad (IRI)	10.90	883	
4	1	Dmitriy Karpov (KAZ)	10.92	878	
5	2	Yu Bin (CHN)	10.97	867	
6	1	Kim Kun-woo (KOR)	11.05	850	
6	2	P. J. Vinod (IND)	11.05	850	
8	1	Bharatinder Singh (IND)	11.06	847	
9	2	Rifat Artikov (UZB)	11.27	801	
10	1	Keisuke Ushiro (JPN)	11.37	780	

=== Long jump ===
Rank	Athlete	Attempt			Result	Points	Notes
Rank	Athlete	1	2	3	Result	Points	Notes
1	Kim Kun-woo (KOR)	7.11 −0.7	7.29 +0.1	7.27 −0.3	7.29	883	
2	Mohammed Al-Qaree (KSA)	6.67 −0.5	7.23 +0.3	7.25 −0.5	7.25	874	
3	Vũ Văn Huyện (VIE)	6.92 −0.4	7.16 +0.7	X −0.1	7.16	852	
4	Dmitriy Karpov (KAZ)	7.11 −0.1	7.04 −0.1	7.14 −1.0	7.14	847	
5	Yu Bin (CHN)	X −0.8	7.14 +1.4	X −0.2	7.14	847	
6	Bharatinder Singh (IND)	7.04 −0.8	7.08 +1.0	7.12; 0.0	7.12	842	
7	P. J. Vinod (IND)	6.54 −0.6	X +0.4	6.91 −0.8	6.91	792	
8	Hadi Sepehrzad (IRI)	6.53 −0.2	6.79; 0.0	6.30 +0.5	6.79	764	
9	Keisuke Ushiro (JPN)	6.67 −0.3	X +0.1	6.74 −0.1	6.74	753	
10	Rifat Artikov (UZB)	6.28 −0.6	4.49 −0.2	6.33 −0.2	6.33	659	

=== Shot put ===
Rank	Athlete	Attempt			Result	Points	Notes
Rank	Athlete	1	2	3	Result	Points	Notes
1	Dmitriy Karpov (KAZ)	16.12	16.34	16.95	16.95	910	
2	Rifat Artikov (UZB)	15.27	15.68	X	15.68	832	
3	Bharatinder Singh (IND)	14.50	X	14.44	14.50	759	
4	P. J. Vinod (IND)	13.77	13.97	14.31	14.31	747	
5	Keisuke Ushiro (JPN)	13.49	13.93	13.16	13.93	724	
6	Yu Bin (CHN)	13.67	13.55	13.81	13.81	717	
7	Kim Kun-woo (KOR)	13.17	X	13.13	13.17	678	
8	Mohammed Al-Qaree (KSA)	12.64	12.47	11.95	12.64	645	
9	Vũ Văn Huyện (VIE)	11.42	11.67	11.80	11.80	594	
—	Hadi Sepehrzad (IRI)				DNS		

=== High jump ===
Rank	Athlete	Attempt										Result	Points	Notes
Rank	Athlete	1.70	1.73	1.76	1.79	1.82	1.85	1.88	1.91	1.94	1.97	Result	Points	Notes
Rank	Athlete	2.00	2.03	2.06								Result	Points	Notes
1	Rifat Artikov (UZB)	–	–	–	–	–	–	–	O	XO	O	2.03	831	
1	Rifat Artikov (UZB)	XXO	XXO	XXX								2.03	831	
2	Dmitriy Karpov (KAZ)	–	–	–	–	–	O	–	XXO	O	XO	2.03	831	
2	Dmitriy Karpov (KAZ)	XO	XXO	XXX								2.03	831	
3	Mohammed Al-Qaree (KSA)	–	–	–	–	–	O	O	O	O	XO	2.00	803	
3	Mohammed Al-Qaree (KSA)	O	XXX									2.00	803	
4	Vũ Văn Huyện (VIE)	–	–	–	–	O	–	–	O	O	O	1.97	776	
4	Vũ Văn Huyện (VIE)	XXX										1.97	776	
5	Keisuke Ushiro (JPN)	–	–	–	–	–	–	O	–	XO	XXX	1.94	749	
6	Bharatinder Singh (IND)	–	–	–	O	–	XO	O	XXO	XXX		1.91	723	
7	Kim Kun-woo (KOR)	–	–	–	–	O	–	XXO	XXO	XXX		1.91	723	
8	Yu Bin (CHN)	–	O	O	–	O	O	XXX				1.85	670	
9	P. J. Vinod (IND)	–	O	O	O	XO	O	XXX				1.85	670	

=== 400 metres ===
Rank	Heat	Athlete	Time	Points	Notes
1	1	Kim Kun-woo (KOR)	48.46	887	
2	2	Vũ Văn Huyện (VIE)	48.93	865	
3	1	Yu Bin (CHN)	50.31	800	
4	2	Dmitriy Karpov (KAZ)	50.79	779	
5	1	Rifat Artikov (UZB)	51.03	768	
6	2	Mohammed Al-Qaree (KSA)	51.08	765	
7	2	Keisuke Ushiro (JPN)	51.14	763	
8	1	P. J. Vinod (IND)	51.84	732	
—	2	Bharatinder Singh (IND)	DNF	0	

=== 110 metres hurdles ===
- Wind – Heat 1: +0.9 m/s
- Wind – Heat 2: +1.3 m/s

Rank	Heat	Athlete	Time	Points	Notes
1	1	Rifat Artikov (UZB)	14.72	884	
2	2	Yu Bin (CHN)	14.75	880	
3	2	Mohammed Al-Qaree (KSA)	14.83	870	
4	1	Dmitriy Karpov (KAZ)	15.03	846	
5	2	Vũ Văn Huyện (VIE)	15.13	834	
6	2	Kim Kun-woo (KOR)	15.17	829	
7	1	Keisuke Ushiro (JPN)	15.39	803	
—	1	Bharatinder Singh (IND)	DNS		
—	2	P. J. Vinod (IND)	DNS		

=== Discus throw ===
Rank	Athlete	Attempt			Result	Points	Notes
Rank	Athlete	1	2	3	Result	Points	Notes
1	Dmitriy Karpov (KAZ)	47.72	48.61	X	48.61	841	
2	Rifat Artikov (UZB)	43.43	44.07	X	44.07	748	
3	Keisuke Ushiro (JPN)	43.44	43.08	X	43.44	735	
4	Yu Bin (CHN)	39.70	40.73	42.82	42.82	722	
5	Vũ Văn Huyện (VIE)	39.15	41.36	41.03	41.36	692	
6	Kim Kun-woo (KOR)	X	38.16	X	38.16	627	
7	Mohammed Al-Qaree (KSA)	35.75	35.04	34.30	35.75	579	

=== Pole vault ===
Rank	Athlete	Attempt										Result	Points	Notes
Rank	Athlete	3.30	3.40	3.50	3.60	3.70	3.80	3.90	4.00	4.10	4.20	Result	Points	Notes
Rank	Athlete	4.30	4.40	4.50	4.60	4.70	4.80	4.90	5.00			Result	Points	Notes
1	Dmitriy Karpov (KAZ)	–	–	–	–	–	–	–	–	–	–	4.90	880	
1	Dmitriy Karpov (KAZ)	–	XO	–	XO	–	O	O	XXX			4.90	880	
2	Kim Kun-woo (KOR)	–	–	–	–	–	–	–	–	–	–	4.80	849	
2	Kim Kun-woo (KOR)	–	XO	–	XXO	XO	O	XXX				4.80	849	
3	Rifat Artikov (UZB)	–	–	–	–	–	–	–	–	–	–	4.70	819	
3	Rifat Artikov (UZB)	–	O	–	O	XO	XXX					4.70	819	
4	Keisuke Ushiro (JPN)	–	–	–	–	–	–	–	O	–	O	4.70	819	
4	Keisuke Ushiro (JPN)	–	XO	O	O	XXO	XXX					4.70	819	
4	Vũ Văn Huyện (VIE)	–	–	–	–	–	–	–	–	–	O	4.70	819	
4	Vũ Văn Huyện (VIE)	–	O	–	XO	XXO	XXX					4.70	819	
6	Yu Bin (CHN)	–	–	–	–	–	–	–	O	–	O	4.50	760	
6	Yu Bin (CHN)	–	O	XO	XXX							4.50	760	
7	Mohammed Al-Qaree (KSA)	–	–	–	–	–	O	–	O	XXX		4.00	617	

=== Javelin throw ===
Rank	Athlete	Attempt			Result	Points	Notes
Rank	Athlete	1	2	3	Result	Points	Notes
1	Keisuke Ushiro (JPN)	64.87	68.57	67.13	68.57	868	
2	Yu Bin (CHN)	62.00	63.18	61.89	63.18	786	
3	Rifat Artikov (UZB)	58.58	X	X	58.58	716	
4	Vũ Văn Huyện (VIE)	53.13	X	55.14	55.14	665	
5	Dmitriy Karpov (KAZ)	47.20	53.62	50.83	53.62	642	
6	Kim Kun-woo (KOR)	51.15	52.52	51.03	52.52	626	
—	Mohammed Al-Qaree (KSA)				DNS		

=== 1500 metres ===
Rank	Athlete	Time	Points	Notes
1	Kim Kun-woo (KOR)	4:13.57	856	
2	Vũ Văn Huyện (VIE)	4:30.20	743	
3	Keisuke Ushiro (JPN)	4:35.66	708	
4	Dmitriy Karpov (KAZ)	4:57.80	572	
5	Yu Bin (CHN)	5:04.04	537	
6	Rifat Artikov (UZB)	5:08.82	510	

=== Summary ===
Rank	Athlete	100m	LJ	SP	HJ	400m	110mH	DT	PV	JT	1500m	Total	Notes
1st place, gold medalist(s)	Dmitriy Karpov (KAZ)	878	847	910	831	779	846	841	880	642	572	8026	
2nd place, silver medalist(s)	Kim Kun-woo (KOR)	850	883	678	723	887	829	627	849	626	856	7808	
3rd place, bronze medalist(s)	Vũ Văn Huyện (VIE)	915	852	594	776	865	834	692	819	665	743	7755	
4	Keisuke Ushiro (JPN)	780	753	724	749	763	803	735	819	868	708	7702	
5	Yu Bin (CHN)	867	847	717	670	800	880	722	760	786	537	7586	
6	Rifat Artikov (UZB)	801	659	832	831	768	884	748	819	716	510	7568	
—	Mohammed Al-Qaree (KSA)	915	874	645	803	765	870	579	617	DNS		DNF	
—	Bharatinder Singh (IND)	847	842	759	723	0	DNS					DNF	
—	P. J. Vinod (IND)	850	792	747	670	732	DNS					DNF	
—	Hadi Sepehrzad (IRI)	883	764	DNS								DNF	
