= 2019 Asian Athletics Championships – Men's decathlon =

Men's decathlon at the 2019 Asian Athletics Championships
- Venue: Khalifa International Stadium
- Location: Doha, Qatar
- Dates: 22-23 April
- Competitors: 9 from 7 nations
- Winning score: 7872 pts

Medalists
gold medal	Keisuke Ushiro	Japan
silver medal	Majed Radhi Al-Sayed	Kuwait
bronze medal	Akihiko Nakamura	Japan

The men's decathlon at the 2019 Asian Athletics Championships was held on 22 and 23 April.

== Records ==
Records before the 2019 Asian Athletics Championships
Record	Athlete (nation)	Points	Location	Date
World record	Kevin Mayer (FRA)	9126	Talence, France	16 September 2018
Asian record	Dmitriy Karpov (KAZ)	8725	Athens, Greece	24 August 2004
Championship record	Dmitriy Karpov (KAZ)	8037	Pune, India	4 July 2013
World leading	Ayden Owens-Delerme (PUR)	8130	Azusa, United States	18 April 2019
Asian leading	No scores recorded			

== Results ==
=== 100 metres ===
Wind: +0.8 m/s

Rank	Lane	Name	Nationality	Time	Points	Notes
1	7	Akihiko Nakamura	Japan	10.73	922	SB
2	5	Gong Kewei	China	10.86	892	SB
3	10	Aries Toledo	Philippines	11.03	854	SB
4	6	Hu Yufei	China	11.06	847	PB
5	2	Majed Radhi Al-Sayed	Kuwait	11.22	812	PB
6	8	Keisuke Ushiro	Japan	11.35	784	SB
7	9	Marat Khaydarov	Uzbekistan	11.48	757	SB
8	4	Abd El-Sajjad Saadoun Nasser	Iraq	11.51	750	SB
9	3	Mohd Al-Mannai	Qatar	11.70	711	SB

=== Long jump ===
Rank	Athlete	Nationality	#1	#2	#3	Result	Points	Notes	Total
1	Gong Kewei	China	x	7.38	7.42	7.42	915	SB	1807
2	Akihiko Nakamura	Japan	7.10	7.25	7.33	7.33	893	SB	1815
3	Majed Radhi Al-Sayed	Kuwait	7.04	x	7.22	7.22	866	SB	1678
4	Abd El-Sajjad Saadoun Nasser	Iraq	6.57	6.85	7.01	7.01	816	SB	1566
5	Keisuke Ushiro	Japan	x	6.98	x	6.98	809	SB	1593
6	Hu Yufei	China	6.82	6.92	6.72	6.92	795	SB	1642
7	Marat Khaydarov	Uzbekistan	6.66	6.84	6.75	6.84	776	PB	1533
8	Aries Toledo	Philippines	6.78	–	–	6.78	762	SB	1616
9	Mohd Al-Mannai	Qatar	6.73	x	x	6.73	750	SB	1461

=== Shot put ===
Rank	Athlete	Nationality	#1	#2	#3	Result	Points	Notes	Total
1	Keisuke Ushiro	Japan	14.71	15.32	14.79	15.32	809	PB	2402
2	Hu Yufei	China	13.83	14.21	13.97	14.21	741	SB	2383
3	Marat Khaydarov	Uzbekistan	12.52	13.47	12.46	13.47	696	PB	2229
4	Majed Radhi Al-Sayed	Kuwait	11.86	12.11	12.98	12.98	666	PB	2344
5	Akihiko Nakamura	Japan	11.57	12.00	11.58	12.00	606	SB	2421
6	Abd El-Sajjad Saadoun Nasser	Iraq	10.23	11.08	11.57	11.57	580	SB	2146
7	Gong Kewei	China	11.11	10.82	11.45	11.45	573	SB	2380
	Mohd Al-Mannai	Qatar				DNS	0		DNF
	Aries Toledo	Philippines				DNS	0		DNF

=== High jump ===
Rank	Athlete	Nationality	1.75	1.78	1.81	1.84	1.87	1.90	1.93	1.96	1.99	2.02	Result	Points	Notes	Total
1	Akihiko Nakamura	Japan	–	–	–	–	–	xo	o	o	xxo	xxx	1.99	794	SB	3215
2	Abd El-Sajjad Saadoun Nasser	Iraq	–	o	–	o	–	o	–	xxo	xxo	xxx	1.99	794	SB	2940
2	Majed Radhi Al-Sayed	Kuwait	o	–	o	–	o	o	xo	xo	xxo	xr	1.99	794	PB	3138
4	Keisuke Ushiro	Japan	–	–	–	–	–	xo	o	xo	xxx		1.96	767	SB	3169
5	Gong Kewei	China	–	–	o	–	xo	–	xo	xxx			1.93	740	SB	3120
6	Marat Khaydarov	Uzbekistan	–	–	o	xo	o	xo	xxo	xxx			1.93	740	SB	2969
7	Hu Yufei	China	–	–	o	–	o	–	xxx				1.87	687		4001

=== 400 metres ===
Rank	Lane	Name	Nationality	Time	Points	Notes	Total
1	5	Majed Radhi Al-Sayed	Kuwait	48.96	863		4256
2	2	Akihiko Nakamura	Japan	49.13	855	SB	4070
3	7	Abd El-Sajjad Saadoun Nasser	Iraq	49.24	850	SB	3790
4	1	Gong Kewei	China	49.37	844		3964
5	3	Hu Yufei	China	50.44	794	SB	3864
6	6	Keisuke Ushiro	Japan	51.81	733	SB	3902
7	4	Marat Khaydarov	Uzbekistan	51.89	730	SB	3699

=== 110 metres hurdles ===
Wind: +2.2 m/s

Rank	Lane	Name	Nationality	Time	Points	Notes	Total
1	4	Hu Yufei	China	14.21	948		4812
2	7	Akihiko Nakamura	Japan	14.24	944		5014
3	9	Abd El-Sajjad Saadoun Nasser	Iraq	15.01	848		4638
4	6	Marat Khaydarov	Uzbekistan	15.02	847		4546
5	5	Majed Radhi Al-Sayed	Kuwait	15.05	843		4844
6	3	Keisuke Ushiro	Japan	15.08	840		4742
	8	Gong Kewei	China	DNS	0		DNF

=== Discus throw ===
Rank	Athlete	Nationality	#1	#2	#3	Result	Points	Notes	Total
1	Keisuke Ushiro	Japan	38.95	42.24	45.32	45.32	773		5515
2	Hu Yufei	China	40.08	x	42.14	42.14	708	SB	5520
3	Marat Khaydarov	Uzbekistan	37.76	x	x	37.76	619	SB	5165
4	Majed Radhi Al-Sayed	Kuwait	35.37	37.66	x	37.66	617	PB	5461
5	Akihiko Nakamura	Japan	32.24	x	34.33	34.33	550		5564
6	Abd El-Sajjad Saadoun Nasser	Iraq	33.43	33.57	33.63	33.63	536	SB	5174

=== Pole vault ===
Rank	Athlete	Nationality	3.40	3.60	3.80	3.90	4.00	4.20	4.30	4.50	4.60	4.70	4.80	4.90	Result	Points	Notes	Total
1	Keisuke Ushiro	Japan	–	–	–	–	–	–	–	–	xxo	o	xxo	xxo	4.90	880	SB	6395
2	Majed Radhi Al-Sayed	Kuwait	–	–	–	–	o	o	xo	o	–	o	xo	xxx	4.80	849	PB	6310
3	Hu Yufei	China	–	–	–	–	–	–	o	o	–	o	xxx		4.70	819	SB	6339
4	Akihiko Nakamura	Japan	–	–	–	–	–	–	–	o	–	o	xxx		4.70	819	SB	6383
5	Abd El-Sajjad Saadoun Nasser	Iraq	o	o	o	o	xxx								3.90	590	SB	5764
	Marat Khaydarov	Uzbekistan	–	–	–	–	xxx								NM	0		5165

=== Javelin throw ===
Rank	Athlete	Nationality	#1	#2	#3	Result	Points	Notes	Total
1	Keisuke Ushiro	Japan	61.03	63.21	65.00	65.00	813	SB	7208
2	Majed Radhi Al-Sayed	Kuwait	54.24	56.28	54.32	56.28	682		6992
3	Hu Yufei	China	54.28	50.53	51.29	54.28	652	PB	6991
4	Akihiko Nakamura	Japan	50.80	48.76	53.78	53.78	645	SB	7028
5	Marat Khaydarov	Uzbekistan	50.53	x	46.93	50.53	596	PB	5761
6	Abd El-Sajjad Saadoun Nasser	Iraq	39.56	40.94	40.35	40.94	456	SB	6220

=== 1500 metres ===
Rank	Name	Nationality	Time	Points	Notes
1	Abd El-Sajjad Saadoun Nasser	Iraq	4:08.80	890	
2	Majed Radhi Al-Sayed	Kuwait	4:15.06	846	PB
3	Akihiko Nakamura	Japan	4:20.41	809	SB
4	Keisuke Ushiro	Japan	4:42.68	664	
5	Hu Yufei	China	4:49.02	625	
6	Marat Khaydarov	Uzbekistan	5:17.77	462	

=== Final standings ===
The highest mark recorded in each event is highlighted in yellow

Rank	Athlete	Nationality	100m	LJ	SP	HJ	400m	110m H	DT	PV	JT	1500m	Points	Notes
1st place, gold medalist(s)	Keisuke Ushiro	Japan	11.35	6.98	15.32	1.96	51.81	15.08	45.32	4.90	65.00	4:42.68	7872	SB
2nd place, silver medalist(s)	Majed Radhi Al-Sayed	Kuwait	11.22	7.22	12.98	1.99	48.96	15.05	37.66	4.80	56.28	4:15.06	7838	NR
3rd place, bronze medalist(s)	Akihiko Nakamura	Japan	10.73	7.33	12.00	1.99	49.13	14.24	34.33	4.70	53.78	4:20.41	7837	SB
4	Hu Yufei	China	11.06	6.92	14.21	1.87	50.44	14.21	42.14	4.70	54.28	4:49.02	7616	PB
5	Abd El-Sajjad Saadoun Nasser	Iraq	11.51	7.01	11.57	1.99	49.24	15.01	33.63	3.90	40.94	4:08.80	7110	NR
6	Marat Khaydarov	Uzbekistan	11.48	6.84	13.47	1.93	51.89	15.02	37.76	NM	50.53	5:17.77	6223	SB
	Gong Kewei	China	10.86	7.42	11.45	1.93	49.37	DNS	–	–	–	–	DNF	
	Aries Toledo	Philippines	11.03	6.78	DNS	–	–	–	–	–	–	–	DNF	
	Mohd Al-Mannai	Qatar	11.70	6.73	DNS	–	–	–	–	–	–	–	DNF	
