= Athletics at the 2018 Asian Games – Men's decathlon =

Men's decathlon at the 2018 Asian Games
- Venue: Gelora Bung Karno Stadium
- Date: 25–26 August 2018
- Competitors: 10 from 8 nations

Medalists
gold medal	Keisuke Ushiro	Japan
silver medal	Sutthisak Singkhon	Thailand
bronze medal	Akihiko Nakamura	Japan

The men's decathlon competition at the 2018 Asian Games took place on 25 and 26 August 2018 at the Gelora Bung Karno Stadium.

== Schedule ==
All times are Western Indonesia Time (UTC+07:00)

Date	Time	Event
Saturday, 25 August 2018	10:00	100 metres
Saturday, 25 August 2018	10:45	Long jump
Saturday, 25 August 2018	12:00	Shot put
Saturday, 25 August 2018	18:50	High jump
Saturday, 25 August 2018	21:25	400 metres
Sunday, 26 August 2018	10:00	110 metres hurdles
Sunday, 26 August 2018	10:45	Discus throw
Sunday, 26 August 2018	12:15	Pole vault
Sunday, 26 August 2018	18:45	Javelin throw
Sunday, 26 August 2018	20:50	1500 metres

== Records ==
Prior to this competition, the existing world, Asian and Games records were as follows.

World Record	Ashton Eaton (USA)	9045	Beijing, China	29 August 2015
Asian Record	Dmitriy Karpov (KAZ)	8725	Athens, Greece	24 August 2004
Games Record	Dmitriy Karpov (KAZ)	8384	Doha, Qatar	11 December 2006

== Results ==
Legend

- DNF — Did not finish
- DNS — Did not start
- r — Retired

=== 100 metres ===
- Wind – Heat 1: +1.6 m/s
- Wind – Heat 2: +1.5 m/s

Rank	Heat	Athlete	Time	Points	Notes
1	1	Mohammed Al-Qaree (KSA)	10.77	912	
2	1	Aries Toledo (PHI)	10.84	897	
3	1	Gong Kewei (CHN)	10.85	894	
3	2	Sutthisak Singkhon (THA)	10.85	894	
5	1	Akihiko Nakamura (JPN)	10.95	872	
6	1	Choe Dong-hwi (KOR)	11.04	852	
7	2	Keisuke Ushiro (JPN)	11.39	776	
8	2	Mohamed Al-Mannai (QAT)	11.42	769	
9	2	Fauma Defril Jumra (INA)	11.45	763	
—	2	Ahmed Al-Yaseen (KSA)	DNS		

=== Long jump ===
Rank	Athlete	Attempt			Result	Points	Notes
Rank	Athlete	1	2	3	Result	Points	Notes
1	Gong Kewei (CHN)	7.54 −0.3	7.70 +0.8	X +0.1	7.70	985	
2	Sutthisak Singkhon (THA)	7.34; 0.0	7.54 −0.2	X +0.4	7.54	945	
3	Akihiko Nakamura (JPN)	7.13 +0.3	X 0.0	7.34; 0.0	7.34	896	
4	Aries Toledo (PHI)	7.10; 0.0	6.97 −0.2	7.21 +0.1	7.21	864	
5	Choe Dong-hwi (KOR)	7.17 −0.1	7.13 +0.2	7.19 −0.1	7.19	859	
6	Mohammed Al-Qaree (KSA)	7.03 +0.2	7.11 +0.1	6.97 −0.5	7.11	840	
7	Keisuke Ushiro (JPN)	6.77 −0.3	6.95 +0.1	7.09 +0.1	7.09	835	
8	Mohamed Al-Mannai (QAT)	6.72 −0.5	6.83 +0.3	X −0.2	6.83	774	
9	Fauma Defril Jumra (INA)	X 0.0	6.13; 0.0	X +0.1	6.13	615	

=== Shot put ===
Rank	Athlete	Attempt			Result	Points	Notes
Rank	Athlete	1	2	3	Result	Points	Notes
1	Keisuke Ushiro (JPN)	13.85	14.29	14.49	14.49	758	
2	Mohamed Al-Mannai (QAT)	14.29	14.05	14.32	14.32	748	
3	Sutthisak Singkhon (THA)	12.87	13.61	13.71	13.71	711	
4	Choe Dong-hwi (KOR)	11.66	11.47	12.77	12.77	653	
5	Mohammed Al-Qaree (KSA)	12.06	11.78	11.81	12.06	610	
6	Gong Kewei (CHN)	11.60	11.47	11.33	11.60	582	
7	Akihiko Nakamura (JPN)	11.43	11.23	11.29	11.43	572	
8	Aries Toledo (PHI)	11.07	10.76	10.67	11.07	550	
9	Fauma Defril Jumra (INA)	X	X	9.68	9.68	466	

=== High jump ===
Rank	Athlete	Attempt										Result	Points	Notes
Rank	Athlete	1.70	1.73	1.76	1.79	1.82	1.85	1.88	1.91	1.94	1.97	Result	Points	Notes
Rank	Athlete	2.00	2.03									Result	Points	Notes
1	Sutthisak Singkhon (THA)	–	–	–	–	O	XO	O	O	O	XO	2.00	803	
1	Sutthisak Singkhon (THA)	O	XXr									2.00	803	
2	Keisuke Ushiro (JPN)	–	–	–	–	–	O	O	O	XO	O	1.97	776	
2	Keisuke Ushiro (JPN)	XXX										1.97	776	
3	Akihiko Nakamura (JPN)	–	–	–	–	–	XO	–	XO	XXO	O	1.97	776	
3	Akihiko Nakamura (JPN)	XXX										1.97	776	
4	Mohamed Al-Mannai (QAT)	–	–	–	–	O	O	O	O	XXX		1.91	723	
4	Gong Kewei (CHN)	–	–	–	O	–	O	–	O	XXX		1.91	723	
6	Aries Toledo (PHI)	–	–	–	O	XXO	O	XXO	XXX			1.88	696	
7	Mohammed Al-Qaree (KSA)	–	–	–	O	O	XXX					1.82	644	
8	Choe Dong-hwi (KOR)	O	–	O	XXO	O	XXX					1.82	644	
9	Fauma Defril Jumra (INA)	XXO	XXX									1.70	544	

=== 400 metres ===
Rank	Heat	Athlete	Time	Points	Notes
1	2	Sutthisak Singkhon (THA)	48.49	886	
2	2	Akihiko Nakamura (JPN)	48.87	867	
3	1	Aries Toledo (PHI)	49.07	858	
4	1	Gong Kewei (CHN)	49.25	849	
5	2	Mohamed Al-Mannai (QAT)	50.05	812	
6	1	Keisuke Ushiro (JPN)	50.29	801	
7	2	Choe Dong-hwi (KOR)	51.85	731	
8	1	Fauma Defril Jumra (INA)	53.74	650	
—	2	Mohammed Al-Qaree (KSA)	DNF	0	

=== 110 metres hurdles ===
- Wind – Heat 1: −0.8 m/s
- Wind – Heat 2: 0.0 m/s

Rank	Heat	Athlete	Time	Points	Notes
1	1	Choe Dong-hwi (KOR)	14.27	940	
2	2	Gong Kewei (CHN)	14.39	925	
3	2	Akihiko Nakamura (JPN)	14.45	917	
4	1	Aries Toledo (PHI)	14.85	868	
5	1	Sutthisak Singkhon (THA)	14.88	864	
6	1	Keisuke Ushiro (JPN)	15.09	839	
7	1	Mohamed Al-Mannai (QAT)	15.19	827	
8	2	Fauma Defril Jumra (INA)	16.22	708	
—	2	Mohammed Al-Qaree (KSA)	DNS		

=== Discus throw ===
Rank	Athlete	Attempt			Result	Points	Notes
Rank	Athlete	1	2	3	Result	Points	Notes
1	Keisuke Ushiro (JPN)	35.03	45.09	45.37	45.09	774	
2	Sutthisak Singkhon (THA)	42.30	44.42	44.17	44.42	755	
3	Mohamed Al-Mannai (QAT)	42.76	38.06	40.77	42.76	721	
4	Akihiko Nakamura (JPN)	34.72	36.84	35.37	36.84	601	
5	Choe Dong-hwi (KOR)	36.46	36.05	X	36.46	593	
6	Gong Kewei (CHN)	34.94	X	35.36	35.36	571	
7	Aries Toledo (PHI)	34.46	33.88	X	34.46	553	
8	Fauma Defril Jumra (INA)	28.59	31.20	29.70	31.20	488	

=== Pole vault ===
Rank	Athlete	Attempt										Result	Points	Notes
Rank	Athlete	3.80	3.90	4.00	4.10	4.20	4.30	4.40	4.50	4.60	4.70	Result	Points	Notes
Rank	Athlete	4.80	4.90	5.00								Result	Points	Notes
1	Keisuke Ushiro (JPN)	–	–	–	–	–	–	–	XO	O	O	4.90	880	
1	Keisuke Ushiro (JPN)	O	O	XXX								4.90	880	
2	Akihiko Nakamura (JPN)	–	–	–	–	–	–	–	O	–	XXO	4.80	849	
2	Akihiko Nakamura (JPN)	XO	XXX									4.80	849	
3	Gong Kewei (CHN)	–	–	O	–	O	–	O	O	XO	XXX	4.60	790	
4	Mohamed Al-Mannai (QAT)	–	–	–	–	O	–	O	XO	XO	XXr	4.60	790	
5	Choe Dong-hwi (KOR)	–	–	XXO	–	O	–	O	–	XO	XXX	4.60	790	
6	Fauma Defril Jumra (INA)	–	–	O	O	O	XXO	XXO	XXX			4.40	731	
7	Sutthisak Singkhon (THA)	O	O	XO	O	O	XXX					4.20	673	
—	Aries Toledo (PHI)											DNS		

=== Javelin throw ===
Rank	Athlete	Attempt			Result	Points	Notes
Rank	Athlete	1	2	3	Result	Points	Notes
1	Keisuke Ushiro (JPN)	63.07	57.17	53.18	63.07	784	
2	Sutthisak Singkhon (THA)	X	56.12	57.07	57.07	694	
3	Mohamed Al-Mannai (QAT)	51.77	55.76	56.31	56.31	682	
4	Fauma Defril Jumra (INA)	54.85	53.30	53.43	54.85	661	
5	Gong Kewei (CHN)	45.71	53.46	X	53.46	640	
6	Choe Dong-hwi (KOR)	53.14	X	50.17	53.14	635	
7	Akihiko Nakamura (JPN)	48.73	51.35	50.33	51.35	609	

=== 1500 metres ===
Rank	Athlete	Time	Points	Notes
1	Akihiko Nakamura (JPN)	4:24.75	779	
2	Gong Kewei (CHN)	4:35.06	712	
3	Keisuke Ushiro (JPN)	4:44.11	655	
4	Choe Dong-hwi (KOR)	4:45.21	648	
5	Mohamed Al-Mannai (QAT)	4:53.87	596	
6	Sutthisak Singkhon (THA)	4:55.89	584	
7	Fauma Defril Jumra (INA)	5:13.13	486	

=== Summary ===
Rank	Athlete	100m	LJ	SP	HJ	400m	110mH	DT	PV	JT	1500m	Total	Notes
1st place, gold medalist(s)	Keisuke Ushiro (JPN)	776	835	758	776	801	839	774	880	784	655	7878	
2nd place, silver medalist(s)	Sutthisak Singkhon (THA)	894	945	711	803	886	864	755	673	694	584	7809	
3rd place, bronze medalist(s)	Akihiko Nakamura (JPN)	872	896	572	776	867	917	601	849	609	779	7738	
4	Gong Kewei (CHN)	894	985	582	723	849	925	571	790	640	712	7671	
5	Mohamed Al-Mannai (QAT)	769	774	748	723	812	827	721	790	682	596	7442	
6	Choe Dong-hwi (KOR)	852	859	653	644	731	940	593	790	635	648	7345	
7	Fauma Defril Jumra (INA)	763	615	466	544	650	708	488	731	661	486	6112	
—	Aries Toledo (PHI)	897	864	550	696	858	868	553	DNS			DNF	
—	Mohammed Al-Qaree (KSA)	912	840	610	644	0	DNS					DNF	
—	Ahmed Al-Yaseen (KSA)											DNS	
