= Yasuhiro Fueki =

Japanese hurdler (born 1985)

Personal information
- Nationality: Japan
- Born: 20 December 1985 (age 40) Chiba, Japan
- Education: Nihon University
- Height: 1.82 m (6 ft 0 in)
- Weight: 72 kg (159 lb)

Sport
- Sport: Track and field
- Event: 400 m hurdles
- Club: Accel Track Club
- Personal best: 49.31 (Chōfu 2013)
Medal record
Men's athletics
Representing Japan
Asian Championships
Gold medal – first place	2013 Pune	400 m hurdles

Yasuhiro Fueki (Japanese: 笛木 靖宏; born 20 December 1985) is a Japanese track and field athlete who competes in the 400 metres hurdles. He is the 2013 Asian champion in the event.

Born in Chiba Prefecture he attended high school in Narita. He dipped under 51 seconds for the first time in 2006, running 50.73 seconds. He reduced this to 50.07 seconds the following season and was a semi-finalist at the 2007 Summer Universiade. He also placed third at the National Sports Festival of Japan that year. He did not compete in the hurdles again until 2011, when he returned to win the 400 m hurdles title at the Japanese Corporate Athletics Championships.

Marking a return to previous form, the 26-year-old ran a personal best of 49.71 seconds in 2011. He improved again to 49.31 seconds to take second at the 2013 Japan Championships in Athletics before going on to claim the gold medal at the 2013 Asian Athletics Championships.

== Personal best ==
Event	Time (s)	Competition	Venue	Date	Notes
400 m hurdles	49.31	Japanese Championships	Chōfu, Japan	9 June 2013	

== International competition ==
Year	Competition	Venue	Position	Event	Time (s)	Notes
Representing Japan
2007	Summer Universiade	Bangkok, Thailand	11th (sf)	400 m hurdles	51.02	
2013	Asian Championships	Pune, India	1st	400 m hurdles	49.86	
2013	World Championships	Moscow, Russia	29th (h)	400 m hurdles	50.66	
