= Keisuke Ushiro =

Japanese decathlete

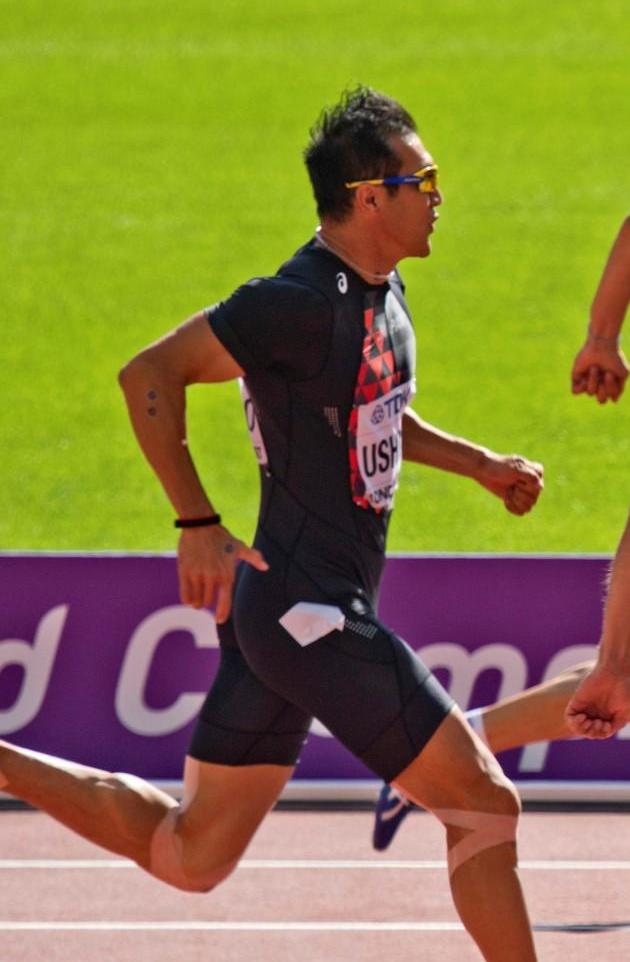

Personal information
- Born: July 24, 1986 (age 39) Ebetsu, Japan
- Height: 1.96 m (6 ft 5 in)
- Weight: 95 kg (209 lb)

Sport
- Country: Japan
- Sport: Athletics
- Event: Decathlon
Medal record
Men's athletics
Representing Japan
Asian Games
Gold medal – first place	2014 Incheon	Decathlon
Gold medal – first place	2018 Jakarta-Palembang	Decathlon
Asian Championships
Gold medal – first place	2019 Doha	Decathlon
Asian Indoor Championships
Silver medal – second place	2012 Hangzhou	Heptathlon

Keisuke Ushiro (右代 啓祐, Ushiro Keisuke; born 24 July 1986 in Ebetsu) is a Japanese decathlete. He competed at the 2012 Summer Olympics.

He competed for Japan at the 2016 Summer Olympics in the decathlon where he finished 20th. He was the flag bearer for Japan during the Parade of Nations.

== Competition record ==
Year	Competition	Venue	Position	Event	Notes
Representing Japan
2010	Asian Games	Guangzhou, China	4th	Decathlon	7702 pts
2011	World Championships	Daegu, South Korea	20th	Decathlon	7639 pts
2012	Asian Indoor Championships	Hangzhou, China	2nd	Heptathlon	5590 pts
2012	Olympic Games	London, United Kingdom	20th	Decathlon	7842 pts
2013	World Championships	Moscow, Russia	22nd	Decathlon	7751 pts
2014	Asian Games	Incheon, South Korea	1st	Decathlon	8088 pts
2015	World Championships	Beijing, China	20th	Decathlon	7532 pts
2016	Olympic Games	Rio de Janeiro, Brazil	20th	Decathlon	7952 pts
2017	World Championships	London, United Kingdom	20th	Decathlon	7498 pts
2018	Asian Games	Jakarta, Indonesia	1st	Decathlon	7878 pts
2019	Asian Championships	Doha, Qatar	1st	Decathlon	7872 pts
2019	World Championships	Doha, Qatar	16th	Decathlon	7545 pts

Olympic Games
Preceded by Saori Yoshida	Flagbearer for Japan; Rio de Janeiro 2016	Succeeded by Yui Susaki & Rui Hachimura
