= Athletics at the 2014 Asian Games – Men's decathlon =

Men's decathlon at the 2014 Asian Games
- Venue: Incheon Asiad Main Stadium
- Dates: 30 September – 1 October 2014
- Competitors: 10 from 8 nations

Medalists
| gold medal | Keisuke Ushiro | Japan |
| silver medal | Leonid Andreev | Uzbekistan |
| bronze medal | Akihiko Nakamura | Japan |

The men's decathlon event at the 2014 Asian Games was held at the Incheon Asiad Main Stadium, Incheon, South Korea on 30 September – 1 October.

== Schedule ==
All times are Korea Standard Time (UTC+09:00)

| Date | Time | Event |
|---|---|---|
| Tuesday, 30 September 2014 | 10:00 | 100 metres |
| Tuesday, 30 September 2014 | 10:40 | Long jump |
| Tuesday, 30 September 2014 | 12:00 | Shot put |
| Tuesday, 30 September 2014 | 18:35 | High jump |
| Tuesday, 30 September 2014 | 21:10 | 400 metres |
| Wednesday, 1 October 2014 | 09:00 | 110 metres hurdles |
| Wednesday, 1 October 2014 | 09:40 | Discus throw |
| Wednesday, 1 October 2014 | 11:20 | Pole vault |
| Wednesday, 1 October 2014 | 18:30 | Javelin throw |
| Wednesday, 1 October 2014 | 21:15 | 1500 metres |

== Records ==
Prior to this competition, the existing world, Asian and Games records were as follows.

| World Record | Ashton Eaton (USA) | 9039 | Eugene, United States | 23 June 2012 |
| Asian Record | Dmitriy Karpov (KAZ) | 8725 | Athens, Greece | 24 August 2004 |
| Games Record | Dmitriy Karpov (KAZ) | 8384 | Doha, Qatar | 11 December 2006 |

== Results ==
Legend

- DNF — Did not finish
- DNS — Did not start

=== 100 metres ===
- Wind – Heat 1: +2.1 m/s
- Wind – Heat 2: +1.7 m/s

| Rank | Heat | Athlete | Time | Points | Notes |
|---|---|---|---|---|---|
| 1 | 1 | Jesson Ramil Cid (PHI) | 10.63 | 945 | |
| 2 | 2 | Akihiko Nakamura (JPN) | 10.66 | 938 | |
| 3 | 1 | Bae Sang-hwa (KOR) | 10.93 | 876 | |
| 4 | 1 | Dmitriy Karpov (KAZ) | 10.94 | 874 | |
| 5 | 1 | Leonid Andreev (UZB) | 10.96 | 870 | |
| 6 | 1 | Keisuke Ushiro (JPN) | 11.10 | 838 | |
| 7 | 2 | Hadi Sepehrzad (IRI) | 11.14 | 830 | |
| 8 | 2 | Guo Qi (CHN) | 11.14 | 830 | |
| 9 | 2 | Mohamed Al-Mannai (QAT) | 11.19 | 819 | |
| 10 | 2 | Marat Khaydarov (UZB) | 11.34 | 786 | |

=== Long jump ===
| Rank | Athlete | Attempt | | | Result | Points | Notes |
| Rank | Athlete | 1 | 2 | 3 | Result | Points | Notes |
|---|---|---|---|---|---|---|---|
| 1 | Akihiko Nakamura (JPN) | 7.31 +0.5 | 6.98 −1.0 | 7.36 +1.3 | 7.36 | 900 | |
| 2 | Mohamed Al-Mannai (QAT) | 7.35 −1.0 | 7.07 +0.7 | 7.28 +0.1 | 7.35 | 898 | |
| 3 | Leonid Andreev (UZB) | 7.24 −1.0 | 7.28 +0.1 | X −0.4 | 7.28 | 881 | |
| 4 | Keisuke Ushiro (JPN) | 6.83 +0.3 | 7.08 −0.6 | 6.99; 0.0 | 7.08 | 833 | |
| 5 | Bae Sang-hwa (KOR) | 7.05 +0.8 | X +0.1 | X −0.3 | 7.05 | 826 | |
| 6 | Guo Qi (CHN) | X −0.2 | X 0.0 | 6.97 −0.6 | 6.97 | 807 | |
| 7 | Marat Khaydarov (UZB) | 6.55 −0.9 | 6.70 −0.2 | 6.81 +0.4 | 6.81 | 769 | |
| 8 | Jesson Ramil Cid (PHI) | 6.79; 0.0 | 6.80 −0.3 | 6.73 +0.6 | 6.80 | 767 | |
| 9 | Hadi Sepehrzad (IRI) | 6.71 +0.2 | 6.70 +0.4 | 6.75 +0.9 | 6.75 | 755 | |
| 10 | Dmitriy Karpov (KAZ) | 6.60 −0.5 | 6.55 −0.8 | 6.70 +0.5 | 6.70 | 743 | |

=== Shot put ===
| Rank | Athlete | Attempt | | | Result | Points | Notes |
| Rank | Athlete | 1 | 2 | 3 | Result | Points | Notes |
|---|---|---|---|---|---|---|---|
| 1 | Hadi Sepehrzad (IRI) | 15.16 | 15.78 | X | 15.78 | 838 | |
| 2 | Leonid Andreev (UZB) | 14.41 | 15.09 | 15.75 | 15.75 | 836 | |
| 3 | Dmitriy Karpov (KAZ) | 14.46 | 14.68 | 15.11 | 15.11 | 796 | |
| 4 | Keisuke Ushiro (JPN) | 14.32 | 14.40 | 14.80 | 14.80 | 777 | |
| 5 | Guo Qi (CHN) | 12.70 | 13.30 | 13.34 | 13.34 | 688 | |
| 6 | Mohamed Al-Mannai (QAT) | 12.27 | 12.97 | 13.34 | 13.34 | 688 | |
| 7 | Marat Khaydarov (UZB) | 12.40 | 12.69 | 13.02 | 13.02 | 668 | |
| 8 | Bae Sang-hwa (KOR) | 11.96 | 11.35 | 11.30 | 11.96 | 604 | |
| 9 | Akihiko Nakamura (JPN) | 11.75 | X | 11.28 | 11.75 | 591 | |
| 10 | Jesson Ramil Cid (PHI) | 10.33 | 11.48 | 11.20 | 11.48 | 575 | |

=== High jump ===
| Rank | Athlete | Attempt | | | | | | | | | | Result | Points | Notes |
| Rank | Athlete | 1.75 | 1.78 | 1.81 | 1.84 | 1.87 | 1.90 | 1.93 | 1.96 | 1.99 | 2.02 | Result | Points | Notes |
| Rank | Athlete | 2.05 | | | | | | | | | | Result | Points | Notes |
|---|---|---|---|---|---|---|---|---|---|---|---|---|---|---|
| 1 | Bae Sang-hwa (KOR) | – | – | – | O | – | O | XO | XXO | XO | O | 2.02 | 822 | |
| 1 | Bae Sang-hwa (KOR) | XXX | | | | | | | | | | 2.02 | 822 | |
| 2 | Marat Khaydarov (UZB) | – | – | – | O | O | – | O | O | XXO | XXO | 2.02 | 822 | |
| 2 | Marat Khaydarov (UZB) | XXX | | | | | | | | | | 2.02 | 822 | |
| 3 | Keisuke Ushiro (JPN) | – | – | – | – | – | O | XO | O | XXO | XXO | 2.02 | 822 | |
| 3 | Keisuke Ushiro (JPN) | XXX | | | | | | | | | | 2.02 | 822 | |
| 4 | Leonid Andreev (UZB) | – | – | – | – | – | O | – | O | O | XXX | 1.99 | 794 | |
| 5 | Akihiko Nakamura (JPN) | – | – | – | – | O | O | O | XXO | XXO | XXX | 1.99 | 794 | |
| 6 | Guo Qi (CHN) | – | – | – | O | – | O | – | O | XXX | | 1.96 | 767 | |
| 7 | Dmitriy Karpov (KAZ) | – | – | – | O | – | XXO | XXO | XXX | | | 1.93 | 740 | |
| 8 | Hadi Sepehrzad (IRI) | – | – | XO | O | XO | O | XXX | | | | 1.90 | 714 | |
| 9 | Jesson Ramil Cid (PHI) | O | XXO | O | O | XXX | | | | | | 1.84 | 661 | |
| 10 | Mohamed Al-Mannai (QAT) | – | O | – | XXX | | | | | | | 1.78 | 610 | |

=== 400 metres ===
| Rank | Heat | Athlete | Time | Points | Notes |
|---|---|---|---|---|---|
| 1 | 1 | Jesson Ramil Cid (PHI) | 48.03 | 908 | |
| 2 | 2 | Akihiko Nakamura (JPN) | 48.19 | 900 | |
| 3 | 2 | Dmitriy Karpov (KAZ) | 49.58 | 834 | |
| 4 | 1 | Leonid Andreev (UZB) | 49.59 | 834 | |
| 5 | 2 | Guo Qi (CHN) | 50.05 | 812 | |
| 6 | 2 | Keisuke Ushiro (JPN) | 50.25 | 803 | |
| 7 | 1 | Marat Khaydarov (UZB) | 50.75 | 780 | |
| 8 | 1 | Hadi Sepehrzad (IRI) | 50.85 | 776 | |
| 9 | 2 | Bae Sang-hwa (KOR) | 51.58 | 743 | |
| — | 1 | Mohamed Al-Mannai (QAT) | DNS | | |

=== 110 metres hurdles ===
- Wind – Heat 1: +0.2 m/s
- Wind – Heat 2: +1.9 m/s

| Rank | Heat | Athlete | Time | Points | Notes |
|---|---|---|---|---|---|
| 1 | 2 | Akihiko Nakamura (JPN) | 14.33 | 932 | |
| 2 | 2 | Guo Qi (CHN) | 14.37 | 927 | |
| 3 | 1 | Dmitriy Karpov (KAZ) | 14.65 | 892 | |
| 4 | 1 | Bae Sang-hwa (KOR) | 14.72 | 884 | |
| 5 | 2 | Marat Khaydarov (UZB) | 14.73 | 882 | |
| 6 | 1 | Leonid Andreev (UZB) | 14.95 | 856 | |
| 6 | 2 | Hadi Sepehrzad (IRI) | 14.95 | 856 | |
| 8 | 1 | Keisuke Ushiro (JPN) | 15.16 | 830 | |
| 9 | 1 | Jesson Ramil Cid (PHI) | 15.24 | 821 | |

=== Discus throw ===
| Rank | Athlete | Attempt | | | Result | Points | Notes |
| Rank | Athlete | 1 | 2 | 3 | Result | Points | Notes |
|---|---|---|---|---|---|---|---|
| 1 | Hadi Sepehrzad (IRI) | 50.56 | X | 50.88 | 50.88 | 889 | |
| 2 | Dmitriy Karpov (KAZ) | 48.77 | 48.66 | 49.55 | 49.55 | 861 | |
| 3 | Keisuke Ushiro (JPN) | 48.88 | 47.33 | 48.98 | 48.98 | 849 | |
| 4 | Leonid Andreev (UZB) | 43.85 | X | 43.56 | 43.85 | 743 | |
| 5 | Guo Qi (CHN) | X | 34.63 | 36.79 | 36.79 | 600 | |
| 6 | Bae Sang-hwa (KOR) | 36.43 | 35.80 | 36.74 | 36.74 | 599 | |
| 7 | Marat Khaydarov (UZB) | 34.36 | 32.77 | 35.72 | 35.72 | 578 | |
| 8 | Akihiko Nakamura (JPN) | 34.22 | 34.75 | 34.18 | 34.75 | 559 | |
| 9 | Jesson Ramil Cid (PHI) | 26.57 | 30.46 | X | 30.46 | 473 | |

=== Pole vault ===
| Rank | Athlete | Attempt | | | | | | | | | | Result | Points | Notes |
| Rank | Athlete | 3.20 | 3.30 | 3.40 | 3.50 | 3.60 | 3.70 | 3.80 | 3.90 | 4.00 | 4.10 | Result | Points | Notes |
| Rank | Athlete | 4.20 | 4.30 | 4.40 | 4.50 | 4.60 | 4.70 | 4.80 | 4.90 | 5.00 | 5.10 | Result | Points | Notes |
| Rank | Athlete | 5.20 | | | | | | | | | | Result | Points | Notes |
|---|---|---|---|---|---|---|---|---|---|---|---|---|---|---|
| 1 | Leonid Andreev (UZB) | – | – | – | – | – | – | – | – | – | – | 5.00 | 910 | |
| 1 | Leonid Andreev (UZB) | – | – | – | – | – | – | XO | – | XXO | – | 5.00 | 910 | |
| 1 | Leonid Andreev (UZB) | XXX | | | | | | | | | | 5.00 | 910 | |
| 2 | Guo Qi (CHN) | – | – | – | – | – | – | – | – | – | – | 4.80 | 849 | |
| 2 | Guo Qi (CHN) | – | – | – | – | O | – | O | – | XXX | | 4.80 | 849 | |
| 3 | Keisuke Ushiro (JPN) | – | – | – | – | – | – | – | – | – | – | 4.70 | 819 | |
| 3 | Keisuke Ushiro (JPN) | – | – | – | – | O | O | XXX | | | | 4.70 | 819 | |
| 4 | Dmitriy Karpov (KAZ) | – | – | – | – | – | – | – | – | – | – | 4.60 | 790 | |
| 4 | Dmitriy Karpov (KAZ) | – | – | – | – | XXO | XXX | | | | | 4.60 | 790 | |
| 5 | Akihiko Nakamura (JPN) | – | – | – | – | – | – | – | – | – | – | 4.50 | 760 | |
| 5 | Akihiko Nakamura (JPN) | – | – | XXO | XO | XXX | | | | | | 4.50 | 760 | |
| 6 | Hadi Sepehrzad (IRI) | – | – | – | – | – | – | – | – | – | – | 4.40 | 731 | |
| 6 | Hadi Sepehrzad (IRI) | O | O | XO | XXX | | | | | | | 4.40 | 731 | |
| 7 | Bae Sang-hwa (KOR) | – | – | – | – | – | – | – | – | XXO | – | 4.20 | 673 | |
| 7 | Bae Sang-hwa (KOR) | O | – | XXX | | | | | | | | 4.20 | 673 | |
| 8 | Marat Khaydarov (UZB) | – | – | – | – | – | – | – | – | O | O | 4.10 | 645 | |
| 8 | Marat Khaydarov (UZB) | XXX | | | | | | | | | | 4.10 | 645 | |
| — | Jesson Ramil Cid (PHI) | – | – | – | – | – | – | – | XXX | | | NM | 0 | |

=== Javelin throw ===
| Rank | Athlete | Attempt | | | Result | Points | Notes |
| Rank | Athlete | 1 | 2 | 3 | Result | Points | Notes |
|---|---|---|---|---|---|---|---|
| 1 | Keisuke Ushiro (JPN) | 62.85 | 68.09 | 62.54 | 68.09 | 860 | |
| 2 | Leonid Andreev (UZB) | 59.66 | 60.05 | 58.27 | 60.05 | 739 | |
| 3 | Bae Sang-hwa (KOR) | 56.11 | 58.49 | 57.46 | 58.49 | 715 | |
| 4 | Hadi Sepehrzad (IRI) | 43.30 | 54.35 | 52.07 | 54.35 | 653 | |
| 5 | Akihiko Nakamura (JPN) | 45.26 | 52.05 | 51.75 | 52.05 | 619 | |
| 6 | Dmitriy Karpov (KAZ) | 43.45 | 50.28 | 47.85 | 50.28 | 593 | |
| 7 | Guo Qi (CHN) | 42.45 | 47.30 | 48.26 | 48.26 | 563 | |
| 8 | Marat Khaydarov (UZB) | 46.20 | 47.16 | 45.42 | 47.16 | 547 | |
| — | Jesson Ramil Cid (PHI) | | | | DNS | | |

=== 1500 metres ===
| Rank | Athlete | Time | Points | Notes |
|---|---|---|---|---|
| 1 | Akihiko Nakamura (JPN) | 4:16.53 | 835 | |
| 2 | Bae Sang-hwa (KOR) | 4:42.69 | 663 | |
| 3 | Guo Qi (CHN) | 4:43.59 | 658 | |
| 4 | Keisuke Ushiro (JPN) | 4:43.76 | 657 | |
| 5 | Dmitriy Karpov (KAZ) | 4:48.86 | 626 | |
| 6 | Marat Khaydarov (UZB) | 4:53.77 | 596 | |
| 7 | Hadi Sepehrzad (IRI) | 5:05.30 | 530 | |
| 8 | Leonid Andreev (UZB) | 5:26.72 | 416 | |

=== Summary ===
| Rank | Athlete | 100m | LJ | SP | HJ | 400m | 110mH | DT | PV | JT | 1500m | Total | Notes |
|---|---|---|---|---|---|---|---|---|---|---|---|---|---|
| 1st place, gold medalist(s) | Keisuke Ushiro (JPN) | 838 | 833 | 777 | 822 | 803 | 830 | 849 | 819 | 860 | 657 | 8088 | |
| 2nd place, silver medalist(s) | Leonid Andreev (UZB) | 870 | 881 | 836 | 794 | 834 | 856 | 743 | 910 | 739 | 416 | 7879 | |
| 3rd place, bronze medalist(s) | Akihiko Nakamura (JPN) | 938 | 900 | 591 | 794 | 900 | 932 | 559 | 760 | 619 | 835 | 7828 | |
| 4 | Dmitriy Karpov (KAZ) | 874 | 743 | 796 | 740 | 834 | 892 | 861 | 790 | 593 | 626 | 7749 | |
| 5 | Hadi Sepehrzad (IRI) | 830 | 755 | 838 | 714 | 776 | 856 | 889 | 731 | 653 | 530 | 7572 | |
| 6 | Guo Qi (CHN) | 830 | 807 | 688 | 767 | 812 | 927 | 600 | 849 | 563 | 658 | 7501 | |
| 7 | Bae Sang-hwa (KOR) | 876 | 826 | 604 | 822 | 743 | 884 | 599 | 673 | 715 | 663 | 7405 | |
| 8 | Marat Khaydarov (UZB) | 786 | 769 | 668 | 822 | 780 | 882 | 578 | 645 | 547 | 596 | 7073 | |
| — | Jesson Ramil Cid (PHI) | 945 | 767 | 575 | 661 | 908 | 821 | 473 | 0 | DNS | | DNF | |
| — | Mohamed Al-Mannai (QAT) | 819 | 898 | 688 | 610 | DNS | | | | | | DNF | |
