= Ali Hazer =

Lebanese athlete (born 1984)

Personal information
- Born: 17 July 1984 (age 41)
- Height: 1.90 m (6 ft 3 in)
- Weight: 88 kg (194 lb)

Sport
- Sport: Athletics
- Event(s): Decathlon, 110 m hurdles, 400 m hurdles
- Club: Ansar
- Coached by: Imad Al-Laymouni

Ali Hazer (born 17 August 1984) is a Lebanese athlete competing in various events including the decathlon, 110 and 400 metres hurdles. He represented his country in the 60 metres hurdles at the 2012 World Indoor Championships without advancing from the first round.

His younger brother, Ahmad Hazer, is also an athlete.

== International competitions ==
Year	Competition	Venue	Position	Event	Notes
Representing Lebanon
2005	Universiade	Bangkok, Thailand	9th	Decathlon	5520 pts
2006	Asian Indoor Championships	Tehran, Iran	9th	Heptathlon	4539 pts
2006	Asian Games	Doha, Qatar	10th (h)	400 m hurdles	55.55
2006	Asian Games	Doha, Qatar	11th	Decathlon	5440 pts
2007	Universiade	Bangkok, Thailand	13th	Decathlon	5295 pts
2007	Pan Arab Games	Cairo, Egypt	4th	Decathlon	6668 pts
2008	Asian Indoor Championships	Doha, Qatar	11th (h)	400 m	50.72
2009	Universiade	Belgrade, Serbia	53rd (h)	200 m	22.63
2009	Universiade	Belgrade, Serbia	37th (h)	400 m	49.41
2009	Universiade	Belgrade, Serbia	–	Decathlon	DNF
2009	Jeux de la Francophonie	Beirut, Lebanon	7th	Decathlon	6716 pts
2009	Arab Championships	Damascus, Syria	3rd	Decathlon	6287 pts
2009	Asian Championships	Guangzhou, China	8th	Decathlon	6476 pts
2010	Asian Indoor Championships	Tehran, Iran	4th	Heptathlon	4813 pts
2010	West Asian Championships	Aleppo, Syria	2nd	Decathlon	6529 pts
2011	Pan Arab Games	Doha, Qatar	4th	Decathlon	6515 pts
2012	World Indoor Championships	Istanbul, Turkey	28th (h)	60 m hurdles	8.84
2013	Arab Championships	Doha, Qatar	4th	Decathlon	6799 pts
2013	Asian Championships	Pune, India	15th (h)	400 m hurdles	53.47
2013	Asian Championships	Pune, India	–	Decathlon	DNF
2013	Jeux de la Francophonie	Nice, France	11th (h)	400 m hurdles	54.73
2014	Asian Indoor Championships	Hangzhou, China	14th (h)	60 m hurdles	8.67
2014	Asian Games	Incheon, South Korea	17th (h)	400 m hurdles	54.66
2016	Asian Indoor Championships	Doha, Qatar	13th (h)	60 m hurdles	8.64

== Personal bests ==
Outdoor

- 100 metres – 10.97 (+1.2 m/s, Beirut 2009)
- 200 metres – 22.11 (+0.6 m/s, Kolin 2016)
- 400 metres – 49.02 (Liberec 2014)
- 1500 metres – 4:42.33 (Beirut 2009)
- 110 metres hurdles – 14.69 (+0.8 m/s, Beirut 2009)
- 400 metres hurdles – 53.37 (Beirut 2016) NR
- High jump – 1.87 (Beirut 2009)
- Pole vault – 3.50 (Beirut 2009)
- Long jump – 6.63 (+0.1 m/s, Doha 2011)
- Shot put – 11.91 (Doha 2011)
- Discus throw – 35.99 (Guangzhou 2009)
- Javelin throw – 45.62 (Doha 2011)
- Decathlon – 6716 (Beirut 2009)

Indoor

- 60 metres – 7.16 (Tehran 2010)
- 200 metres – 22.50 (Prague 2014) NR
- 400 metres – 50.72 (Doha 2008)
- 1000 metres – 2:52.32 (Tehran 2010) NR
- 60 metres hurdles – 8.51 (Prague 2014)
- High jump – 1.83 (Tehran 2010)
- Pole vault – 3.40 (Tehran 2010) NR
- Long jump – 6.43 ( Tehran 2010)
- Shot put – 11.59 (Tehran 2010) NR
- Heptathlon – 4813 (Tehran 2010) NR
