= Mohammed Al-Qaree =

Saudi Arabian athlete (born 1988)

Mohammed Jasem Al-Qaree
Personal information
- Born: 11 May 1988 (age 37)
- Height: 1.84 m (6 ft 0 in)
- Weight: 82 kg (181 lb)

Sport
- Sport: Athletics
- Event: Decathlon

Mohammed Jasem M. Al-Qaree (Arabic: محمد القرعي; born 11 May 1988) is a Saudi Arabian athlete competing in the combined events. He won multiple medals at regional level. He currently holds national records in the decathlon and indoor heptathlon.

== International competitions ==
Year	Competition	Venue	Position	Event	Notes
Representing Saudi Arabia
2004	Arab Youth Championships	Rabat, Morocco	1st	Octathlon	5700 pts
2005	World Youth Championships	Marrakesh, Morocco	–	Octathlon	DNF
2006	Asian Junior Championships	Macau, China	3rd	Decathlon (junior)	6564 pts
2007	Arab Championships	Amman, Jordan	1st	Decathlon	7366 pts
2009	Arab Championships	Damascus, Syria	1st	Decathlon	7642 pts
2009	Asian Indoor Games	Hanoi, Vietnam	1st	Heptathlon	5791 pts
2010	Asian Games	Guangzhou, China	–	Decathlon	DNF
2011	Asian Championships	Kobe, Japan	–	Decathlon	DNF
2011	Arab Championships	Al Ain, United Arab Emirates	1st	Decathlon	7498 pts
2011	Pan Arab Games	Doha, Qatar	1st	Decathlon	7677 pts
2013	Arab Championships	Doha, Qatar	–	Decathlon	DNF
2015	Arab Championships	Isa Town, Bahrain	1st	Decathlon	7572 pts
2016	Asian Indoor Championships	Doha, Qatar	5th	Heptathlon	5579 pts
2017	Asian Indoor and Martial Arts Games	Ashgabat, Turkmenistan	1st	Heptathlon	5343 pts
2018	Asian Games	Jakarta, Indonesia	–	Decathlon	DNF

== Personal bests ==
Outdoors

- 100 metres – 10.61 (Qatif 2015)
- 400 metres – 49.36 (Manama 2015)
- 1500 metres – 5:28.42 (Manama 2015)
- 110 metres hurdles – 14.51 (Qatif 2015)
- 400 metres hurdles – 52.42 (Makkah 2009)
- High jump – 2.00 (Guangzhou 2010)
- Pole vault – 4.50 (Riyadh 2013)
- Long jump – 7.42 (0.0 m/s, Makkah 2011)
- Shot put – 12.97 (Manama 2015)
- Discus throw – 37.01 (Manama 2015)
- Javelin throw – 54.11 (Manama 2015)
- Decathlon – 7642 (Damascus 2009)

Indoors

- 60 metres – 6.84 (Hanoi 2009)
- 1000 metres – 2:52.04 (Hanoi 2009)
- 60 metres hurdles – 8.08 (Doha 2016)
- High jump – 2.06 (Hanoi 2009)
- Pole vault – 4.40 (Hanoi 2009)
- Long jump – 7.35 (Hanoi 2009)
- Shot put – 13.32 (Doha 2016)
- Heptathlon – 5791 (Hanoi 2009)
