= Rifat Artikov =

Uzbek decathlete

Medal record

Men's athletics

Representing Uzbekistan

Asian Indoor Championships
Bronze medal – third place	2004 Tehran	Heptathlon

Rifat Rimatovich Artikov (born 24 January 1983, in Tashkent Region) is an Uzbek decathlete.

His best points for a decathlon is 7,975, achieved when he finished first at the Uzbekistan Cup in Tashkent on 12 June 2011, which enabled him to qualify for the Olympic Games in London.

== Achievements ==
Year	Competition	Venue	Position	Event	Notes
Representing Uzbekistan
2001	Asian Junior Championships	Bandar Seri Begawan, Brunei	6th	Decathlon	6077 pts
2002	World Junior Championships	Kingston, Jamaica	16th	Decathlon (junior)	6456 pts
2002	Asian Junior Championships	Bangkok, Thailand	3rd	Decathlon (junior)	6809 pts
2004	Asian Indoor Championships	Tehran, Iran	3rd	Heptathlon	5299 pts
2006	Asian Indoor Championships	Pattaya, Thailand	5th	Heptathlon	5061 pts
2007	Asian Championships	Amman, Jordan	–	Pole vault	NM
2009	Asian Championships	Guangzhou, China	6th	Decathlon	6678 pts
2010	Asian Games	Guangzhou, China	6th	Decathlon	7568 pts
2011	Asian Championships	Kobe, Japan	–	Decathlon	DNF
2012	Olympic Games	London, United Kingdom	26th	Decathlon	7203 pts
