= Akihiko Nakamura =

Japanese decathlete (born 1990)

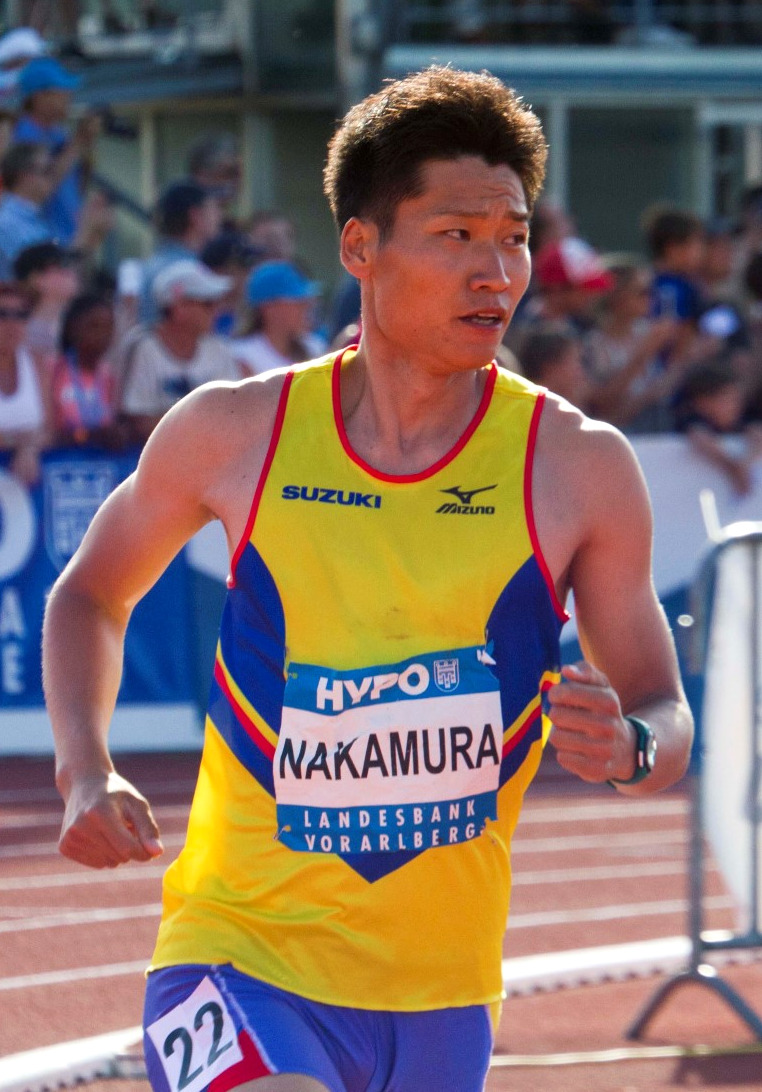
- Nakamura in 2017

Personal information
- Born: 23 October 1990 (age 35) Nagoya, Japan
- Education: Chukyo University
- Height: 1.80 m (5 ft 11 in)
- Weight: 73 kg (161 lb)

Sport
- Country: Japan
- Sport: Men's athletics
- Event: Decathlon
- Coached by: Katsuhiko Matsuda

Achievements and titles
- Personal best(s): 100 m – 10.66 (2014); 400 m – 47.17 (2012); 1500 m – 4:14.09 (2012); 110 mH – 13.90 (2012); 400 mH – 49.38 (2012); HJ – 2.10 m (2007); PV – 4.90 m (2014); LJ – 7.56 m (2017); SP – 12.44 m (2014); DT – 37.39 m (2018); JT – 54.77 m (2010); Dec – 8035 (2014)
Medal record
Asian Games
Bronze medal – third place	2014 Incheon	Decathlon
Bronze medal – third place	2018 Jakarta–Palembang	Decathlon
Asian Championships
Gold medal – first place	2015 Wuhan	Decathlon
Silver medal – second place	2011 Kobe	Decathlon
Silver medal – second place	2013 Pune	Decathlon
Bronze medal – third place	2019 Doha	Decathlon
Asian Indoor Athletics Championships
Gold medal – first place	2016 Doha	Heptathlon
Silver medal – second place	2014 Hangzhou	Heptathlon

Akihiko Nakamura (中村 明彦, Nakamura Akihiko; born 23 October 1990) is a Japanese decathlete. He competed in the 400 m hurdles at the 2012 Summer Olympics, but was disqualified in the heats. At the 2016 Rio Games he placed 22nd in the decathlon. Nakamura won several medals on continental level in heptathlon and decathlon.

== International competitions ==
Representing Japan
Year	Competition	Venue	Position	Event	Notes
2007	World Youth Championships	Ostrava, Czech Republic	18th (q)	High jump	2.04 m
2011	Asian Championships	Kobe, Japan	2nd	Decathlon	7478 pts
2012	Olympic Games	London, United Kingdom	–	400 m hurdles	DQ
2013	Asian Championships	Pune, India	2nd	Decathlon	7620 pts
2014	Asian Indoor Championships	Hangzhou, China	2nd	Heptathlon	5693 pts
2014	Asian Games	Incheon, South Korea	3rd	Decathlon	7828 pts
2015	Asian Championships	Wuhan, China	1st	Decathlon	7773 pts
2015	World Championships	Beijing, China	16th	Decathlon	7745 pts
2016	Asian Indoor Championships	Doha, Qatar	1st	Heptathlon	5831 pts
2016	Olympic Games	Rio de Janeiro, Brazil	22nd	Decathlon	7612 pts
2017	World Championships	London, United Kingdom	19th	Decathlon	7646 pts
2018	Asian Games	Jakarta, Indonesia	3rd	Decathlon	7738 pts
2019	Asian Championships	Doha, Qatar	3rd	Decathlon	7837 pts
