= Yuta Imazeki =

Japanese hurdler (born 1987)

Personal information
- Born: 6 November 1987 (age 38) Chiba, Japan
- Height: 1.76 m (5 ft 9 in)
- Weight: 60 kg (132 lb)

Sport
- Sport: Track and field
- Event: 400 metres hurdles

Yuta Imazeki (今関 雄太, Imazeki Yūta; born 6 November 1987 in Chiba) is a Japanese athlete who specialised in the 400 metres hurdles. He represented his country at the 2011 World Championships without qualifying for the semifinals. In addition, he won the silver medal at the 2011 Asian Championships.

His personal best in the event is 49.27 set in Osaka in 2011.

== Competition record ==
Year	Competition	Venue	Position	Event	Notes
Representing Japan
2009	East Asian Games	Hong Kong, China	3rd	400 m hurdles	51.20
2009	East Asian Games	Hong Kong, China	1st	4 × 400 m relay	3:07.08
2011	Asian Championships	Kobe, Japan	2nd	400 m hurdles	50.22
2011	World Championships	Daegu, South Korea	30th (h)	400 m hurdles	50.92
2013	Asian Championships	Pune, India	4th	400 m hurdles	50.36
