= Cheng Wen =

Chinese hurdler (born 1989)

Personal information
- Born: April 6, 1989 (age 37)
- Height: 1.88 m (6 ft 2 in)
- Weight: 76 kg (168 lb)

Sport
- Country: China
- Sport: Athletics
- Event: 400 m hurdles

Cheng Wen (Chinese: 程文; born 6 April 1989 in Binzhou) is a Chinese athlete who competes in the 400 metre hurdles. He represented his country at the 2012 Summer Olympics, as well as the 2011 World Championships.

His personal best in the event is 49.28 seconds, set in Fuzhou in 2011.

== Competition record ==
Year	Competition	Venue	Position	Event	Notes
Representing China
2011	World Championships	Daegu, South Korea	29th (h)	400 m hurdles	50.51
2012	Olympic Games	London, United Kingdom	39th (h)	400 m hurdles	50.38
2013	Asian Championships	Pune, India	2nd	400 m hurdles	50.07
2013	East Asian Games	Tianjin, China	1st	400 m hurdles	49.66
2014	Asian Games	Incheon, South Korea	3rd	400 m hurdles	50.29
2014	Asian Games	Incheon, South Korea	5th	4 × 400 m relay	3:06.51
2015	Asian Championships	Wuhan, China	4th	400 m hurdles	50.04
2015	World Championships	Beijing, China	21st (sf)	400 m hurdles	49.62
