= 2015 Asian Athletics Championships – Men's decathlon =

The men's decathlon event at the 2015 Asian Athletics Championships was held on June 6 and 7.

== Medalists ==
Gold	Silver	Bronze
Akihiko Nakamura; Japan	Guo Qi; China	Hu Yufei; China

== Results ==
=== 100 metres ===
Wind: –0.9 m/s

Rank	Lane	Name	Nationality	Time	Points	Notes
1	1	Akihiko Nakamura	Japan	10.68	933	
2	4	Chen Xiaohong	China	11.03	854	
3	6	Hu Yufei	China	11.16	825	
4	2	Guo Qi	China	11.38	778	
5	3	Marat Khaydarov	Uzbekistan	11.54	744	
6	5	Mohd Ahmed Al-Mannai	Qatar	11.70	711	

=== Long jump ===
Rank	Athlete	Nationality	#1	#2	#3	Result	Points	Notes	Total
1	Akihiko Nakamura	Japan	7.25	x	7.35	7.35	898		1831
2	Chen Xiaohong	China	6.81	6.87	7.22	7.22	866		1720
3	Hu Yufei	China	7.14	7.04	6.92	7.14	847		1672
4	Mohd Ahmed Al-Mannai	Qatar	6.42	6.87	6.94	6.94	799		1510
5	Guo Qi	China	6.92	6.87	6.93	6.93	797		1575
6	Marat Khaydarov	Uzbekistan	6.66	6.74	6.71	6.74	753		1497

=== Shot put ===
Rank	Athlete	Nationality	#1	#2	#3	Result	Points	Notes	Total
1	Guo Qi	China	13.26	13.36	13.39	13.39	691		2266
2	Hu Yufei	China	13.13	–	–	13.13	675		2347
3	Mohd Ahmed Al-Mannai	Qatar	12.27	12.84	x	12.84	657		2167
4	Chen Xiaohong	China	x	12.28	12.60	12.60	643		2363
5	Marat Khaydarov	Uzbekistan	11.81	x	12.39	12.39	630		2127
6	Akihiko Nakamura	Japan	11.39	11.09	11.07	11.39	569		2400

=== High jump ===
Rank	Athlete	Nationality	1.80	1.83	1.86	1.89	1.92	1.95	1.98	2.01	Result	Points	Notes	Overall
1	Akihiko Nakamura	Japan	–	–	–	o	–	xo	o	xxx	1.98	785		3185
2	Marat Khaydarov	Uzbekistan	o	o	–	o	xo	xo	o	xxx	1.98	785		2912
3	Hu Yufei	China	–	–	o	–	o	o	xo	xxx	1.98	785		3132
4	Guo Qi	China	–	–	o	–	o	o	xxo	xxx	1.98	785		3051
5	Mohd Ahmed Al-Mannai	Qatar	o	o	o	xxx					1.86	679		2846
6	Chen Xiaohong	China	xxo	–	–	xxx					1.80	627		2990

=== 400 metres ===
Rank	Lane	Name	Nationality	Time	Points	Notes	Total
1	7	Akihiko Nakamura	Japan	47.47	935		4120
2	2	Hu Yufei	China	49.20	852		3984
3	4	Guo Qi	China	49.87	821		3872
4	6	Chen Xiaohong	China	50.30	801		3791
5	3	Marat Khaydarov	Uzbekistan	50.56	789		3701
	5	Mohd Ahmed Al-Mannai	Qatar	DNS	0		DNF

=== 110 metres hurdles ===
Wind: +1.2 m/s

Rank	Lane	Name	Nationality	Time	Points	Notes	Total
1	4	Guo Qi	China	14.26	941		4813
2	7	Akihiko Nakamura	Japan	14.40	924		5044
3	6	Hu Yufei	China	14.54	906		4890
4	3	Marat Khaydarov	Uzbekistan	14.75	880		4581
5	2	Chen Xiaohong	China	15.66	772		4563

=== Discus throw ===
Rank	Athlete	Nationality	#1	#2	#3	Result	Points	Notes	Total
1	Chen Xiaohong	China	36.20	38.67	31.89	38.67	638		5201
2	Hu Yufei	China	x	35.88	36.74	36.74	599		5489
3	Marat Khaydarov	Uzbekistan	36.05	x	34.99	36.05	585		5166
4	Guo Qi	China	x	x	35.29	35.29	569		5382
5	Akihiko Nakamura	Japan	33.84	32.95	30.65	33.84	541		5585

=== Pole vault ===
Rank	Athlete	Nationality	3.80	4.00	4.20	4.30	4.40	4.50	4.60	4.70	Result	Points	Notes	Total
1	Akihiko Nakamura	Japan	–	–	–	xo	o	o	o	xxx	4.60	790		6375
2	Guo Qi	China	–	–	–	–	–	o	xxx		4.50	760		6142
3	Hu Yufei	China	xo	o	o	–	xxx				4.20	673		6162
	Marat Khaydarov	Uzbekistan	xxx								NM	0		5166
	Chen Xiaohong	China	x								NM	0		5201

=== Javelin throw ===
Rank	Athlete	Nationality	#1	#2	#3	Result	Points	Notes	Overall
1	Chen Xiaohong	China	53.04	54.71	57.21	57.21	696		5897
2	Akihiko Nakamura	Japan	49.74	50.95	52.82	52.82	630		7005
3	Guo Qi	China	49.34	47.98	50.19	50.19	591		6733
4	Marat Khaydarov	Uzbekistan	43.20	45.92	42.54	45.92	528		5694
5	Hu Yufei	China	26.73	–	–	26.73	253		6415

=== 1500 metres ===
Rank	Name	Nationality	Time	Points	Notes
1	Akihiko Nakamura	Japan	4:26.49	768	
2	Hu Yufei	China	4:48.59	627	
3	Guo Qi	China	5:00.64	556	
4	Chen Xiaohong	China	5:13.81	483	
5	Marat Khaydarov	Uzbekistan	5:17.24	465	

=== Final standings ===
The highest mark recorded in each event is highlighted in yellow

Rank	Athlete	Nationality	100m	LJ	SP	HJ	400m	110m H	DT	PV	JT	1500m	Points	Notes
1st place, gold medalist(s)	Akihiko Nakamura	Japan	10.68	7.35	11.39	1.98	47.47	14.40	33.84	4.60	52.82	4:26.49	7773	
2nd place, silver medalist(s)	Guo Qi	China	11.38	6.93	13.39	1.98	49.87	14.26	35.29	4.50	50.19	5:00.64	7289	
3rd place, bronze medalist(s)	Hu Yufei	China	11.16	7.14	13.13	1.98	49.20	14.54	36.74	4.20	26.73	4:48.59	7042	
4	Chen Xiaohong	China	11.03	7.22	12.60	1.80	50.30	15.66	38.67	NM	57.21	5:13.81	6380	
5	Marat Khaydarov	Uzbekistan	11.54	6.74	12.39	1.98	50.56	14.75	36.05	NM	45.92	5:17.24	6159	
	Mohd Ahmed Al-Mannai	Qatar	11.70	6.94	12.84	1.86	DNS	–	–	–	–	–	DNF	
