= Hadi Sepehrzad =

Iranian decathlete

Medal record

Representing Iran

Men's athletics

Asian Championships
Gold medal – first place	2011 Kobe	Decathlon
Silver medal – second place	2007 Amman	Decathlon
Silver medal – second place	2009 Guangzhou	Decathlon

Asian Indoor Games
Silver medal – second place	2005 Bangkok	Heptathlon

Asian Indoor Championships
Gold medal – first place	2010 Tehran	Heptathlon
Silver medal – second place	2008 Doha	Heptathlon

West Asian Games
Silver medal – second place	2005 Doha	Decathlon

Hadi Sepehrzad (Persian: هادی سپهرزاد; born 19 January 1983 in Tehran) is an Iranian decathlete and the national record holder with 7729 points (Tehran 2012). Sepehrzad is also the national record holder of the indoor heptathlon with 5515 points (Doha 2008).

== Competition record ==
Year	Competition	Venue	Position	Event	Notes
Representing Iran
2002	Asian Junior Championships	Bangkok, Thailand	5th	Decathlon (Jr)	6494 pts
2005	Asian Championships	Incheon, South Korea	7th	Decathlon	6889 pts
2005	Asian Indoor Games	Doha, Qatar	2nd	Heptathlon	5324 pts
2005	West Asian Games	Doha, Qatar	2nd	Decathlon	5660 pts
2006	Asian Games	Doha, Qatar	7th	Decathlon	6992 pts
2007	Asian Championships	Amman, Jordan	2nd	Decathlon	7667 pts
2008	Asian Indoor Championships	Doha, Qatar	2nd	Heptathlon	5515 pts
2008	Olympic Games	Beijing, China	22nd	Decathlon	7483 pts
2009	Asian Indoor Games	Hanoi, Vietnam	5th	Heptathlon	5175 pts
2009	Asian Championships	Guangzhou, China	2nd	Decathlon	7262 pts
2010	Asian Indoor Championships	Tehran, Iran	1st	Heptathlon	5292 pts
2010	West Asian Championships	Aleppo, Syria	1st	Decathlon	6991 pts
2010	Asian Games	Guangzhou, China	–	Decathlon	DNF
2011	Asian Championships	Kobe, Japan	1st	Decathlon	7506 pts
2011	Universiade	Shenzhen, China	–	Decathlon	DNF
2011	World Championships	Daegu, South Korea	–	Decathlon	DNF
2013	Asian Championships	Pune, India	–	Decathlon	DNF
2014	Asian Indoor Championships	Hangzhou, China	–	Heptathlon	DNF
2014	Asian Games	Incheon, South Korea	5th	Decathlon	7572 pts

== Personal bests ==
Decathlon:

- 100 m: 10.82 s
- Long jump: 7.05 m
- Shot put: 16.24 m
- High jump: 1.94 m
- 400 m: 49.82 s
- 110 m hurdles: 14.69 s
- Discus throw: 49.17 m
- Pole vault: 4.40 m
- Discus throw: 54.84 m
- 1500 m: 5:02.58 min:s

Indoor heptathlon:

- 60 m: 6.97 s
- Long jump: 6.97 m
- Shot put: 16.03 m
- High jump: 1.96 m
- 60 m hurdles: 8.27 s
- Pole vault: 4.00 m
- 1000 m: 2:54.20 min:s
