= 2013 Asian Athletics Championships – Men's 400 metres hurdles =

Event in the 2013 Asian Athletics Championships

The men's 400 metres hurdles event at the 2013 Asian Athletics Championships was held at the Shree Shiv Chhatrapati Sports Complex. The final took place on 7 July.

== Medalists ==
Gold	Silver	Bronze
Yasuhiro Fueki; Japan	Cheng Wen; China	Satinder Singh; India

== Results ==
=== Heats ===
First 2 in each heat (Q) and 2 best performers (q) advanced to the semifinals.

Rank	Heat	Name	Nationality	Time	Notes
1	1	Yasuhiro Fueki	Japan	50.89	Q
2	1	Satinder Singh	India	51.20	Q
3	2	Yuta Imazeki	Japan	51.24	Q
4	3	Cheng Wen	China	51.36	Q
5	3	Gamal Abdelnasir Abubaker	Qatar	51.68	Q
6	2	Chen Chieh	Chinese Taipei	51.74	Q
7	1	Cray Eric Shauwn	Philippines	51.83	q
8	3	Artem Dyatlov	Uzbekistan	52.07	q
9	2	Jithin Paul	India	52.15	
10	3	Saud Abdul Karim	United Arab Emirates	52.26	
11	1	Dao Xuan Cuong	Vietnam	52.34	
12	3	Chen Yu-Te	Chinese Taipei	52.40	
13	1	Haidar Al-Jumah	Saudi Arabia	52.57	
14	3	Chan Ka Chun	Hong Kong	53.18	
15	1	Ali Hazer	Lebanon	53.47	
16	3	Ramchandren	India	53.58	
17	2	Aleksei Namuratov	Kyrgyzstan	53.80	
18	2	Narongdech Janjai	Thailand	54.07	
	2	Viktor Leptikov	Kazakhstan	DNF	
	1	Ali Khamis Khamis	Bahrain	DNS	

=== Final ===
Rank	Name	Nationality	Time	Notes
1st place, gold medalist(s)	Yasuhiro Fueki	Japan	49.86	
2nd place, silver medalist(s)	Cheng Wen	China	50.07	
3rd place, bronze medalist(s)	Satinder Singh	India	50.35	
4	Yuta Imazeki	Japan	50.36	
5	Chen Chieh	Chinese Taipei	50.86	
6	Gamal Abdelnasir Abubaker	Qatar	51.69	
7	Artem Dyatlov	Uzbekistan	52.09	
	Cray Eric Shauwn	Philippines	DNF	
