= Hiromasa Tanaka =

Japanese decathlete (born 1981)

Medal record

Men's athletics

Representing Japan

Asian Championships
Gold medal – first place	2009 Guangzhou	Decathlon
Bronze medal – third place	2005 Incheon	Decathlon

Asian Indoor Championships
Bronze medal – third place	2008 Doha	Heptathlon
Bronze medal – third place	2012 Hangzhou	Heptathlon

Hiromasa Tanaka (Japanese: 田中宏昌; born 28 September 1981) is a Japanese decathlete. He won five straight national decathlon titles from 2004 to 2008 and was the gold medallist in the event at the 2009 Asian Athletics Championships. He also represented Japan at the 2007 World Championships.

Hailing from Ōbatake, Yamaguchi, Tanaka established himself domestically with back-to-back decathlon wins at the Japanese Athletics Championships in 2004 and 2005. On his first international appearance, he won the bronze medal at the 2005 Asian Athletics Championships, finishing behind Pavel Andreev and Kim Kun-Woo. He took a third consecutive national title in 2006, a winning streak that would continue until 2009 when he was beaten by Daisuke Ikeda.

At the 2006 Asian Indoor Athletics Championships he missed out on a medal in the indoor heptathlon, although he achieved 5340 points in his first major outing in the event. He scored a personal best total of 7803 points for decathlon in Kanazawa in June 2006, but at his first Asian Games that year he was far off this form and, after he failed to produce a mark in the pole vault, he finished in tenth place. As the reigning national champion, Tanaka gained selection for the 2007 World Championships in Athletics, held in Osaka, and he finished in 19th place overall.

Tanaka won his first indoor medal at the 2008 Asian Indoor Athletics Championships, taking the bronze at the event in Doha. In the absence of Dmitriy Karpov and the defending champion Ahmed Hassan Moussa, he won the 2009 Asian Athletics Championships. He missed the 2010 Asian Games.
