= Sutinder Singh Noor =

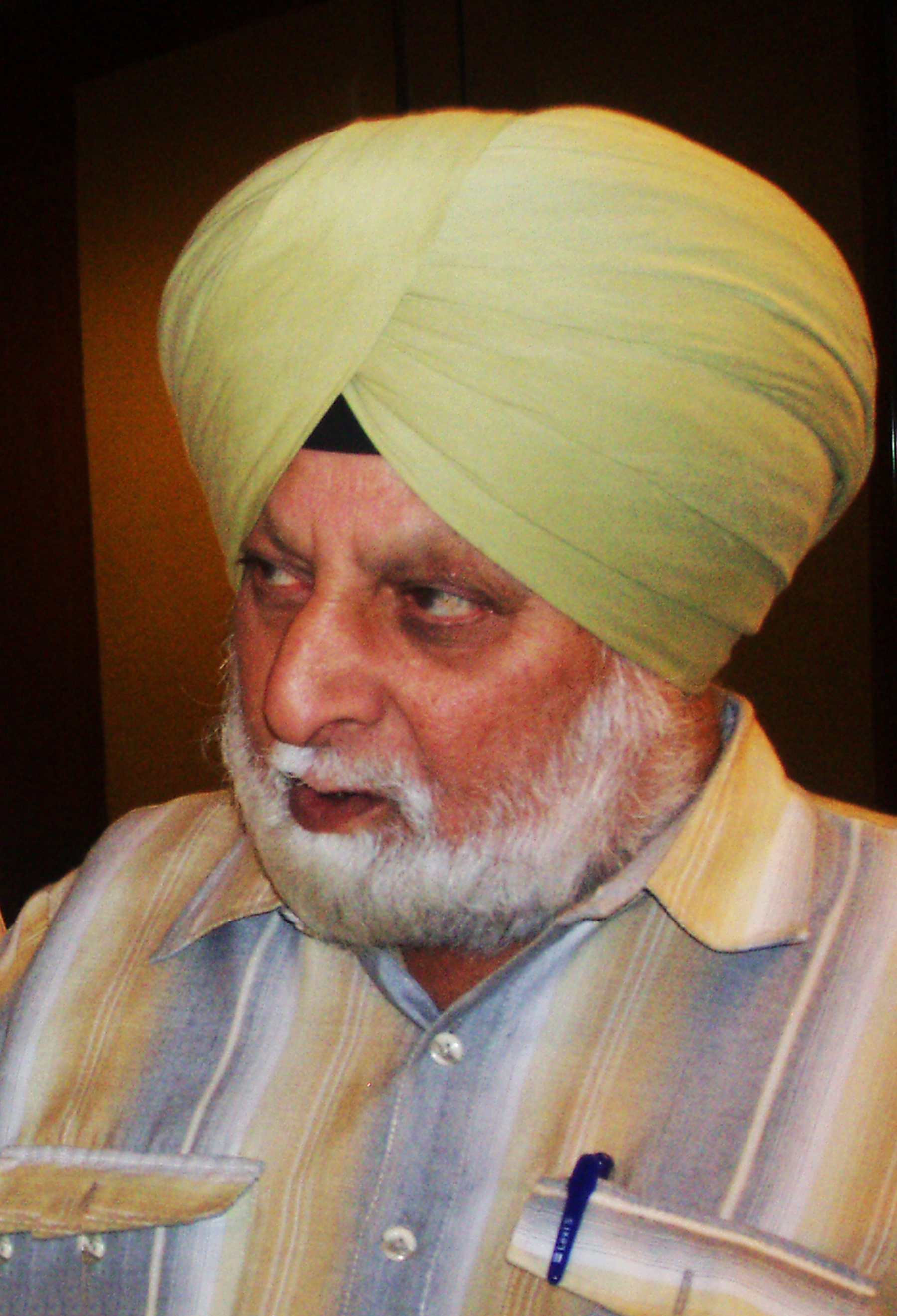
- Born: 5 October 1940; Kotkpura, distt. Faridkot (now)
- Died: 9 February 2011 (aged 70); Delhi
- Citizenship: India
- Education: Masters in Punjabi, PhD
- Occupations: critic, poet
- Spouse: Harcharan Kaur
- Parent(s): Hari Singh Jachak (father); Jaswant Kaur (mother)
- Relatives: Gurbhagat Singh (brother); Sukhinder Singh (brother)

Sutinder Singh Noor (5 October 1940 – 9 February 2011) was an eminent Punjabi poet and critic. He won the Sahitya Akademi Award in 2004 for his book of criticism, Kavita di Bhoomika. He is better known for his criticism. A former head of the Department of Punjabi, Delhi University, and editor of Punjabi Akademi journal Samdarshi, Noor was well known in Punjab's literary circles.

== Works ==
- ADHUNIK PUNJABI KAV SIDHANTAK PARIPEKH
- BIRKH NIPATTRE
- GURU GOBIND SINGH DA SANCHAR SABHYACHAR
- ITIHAS DA GAURAV: M. RANJIT SINGH
- KAVITA DI JALAVATNI
- NAIK KHASAM HAMARE
- PARHDIAN LIKHDIAN
- SABHIACHAR TE SAHIT
- SAMVAD SIRJANA
