= Satinder Singh =

Indian hurdler

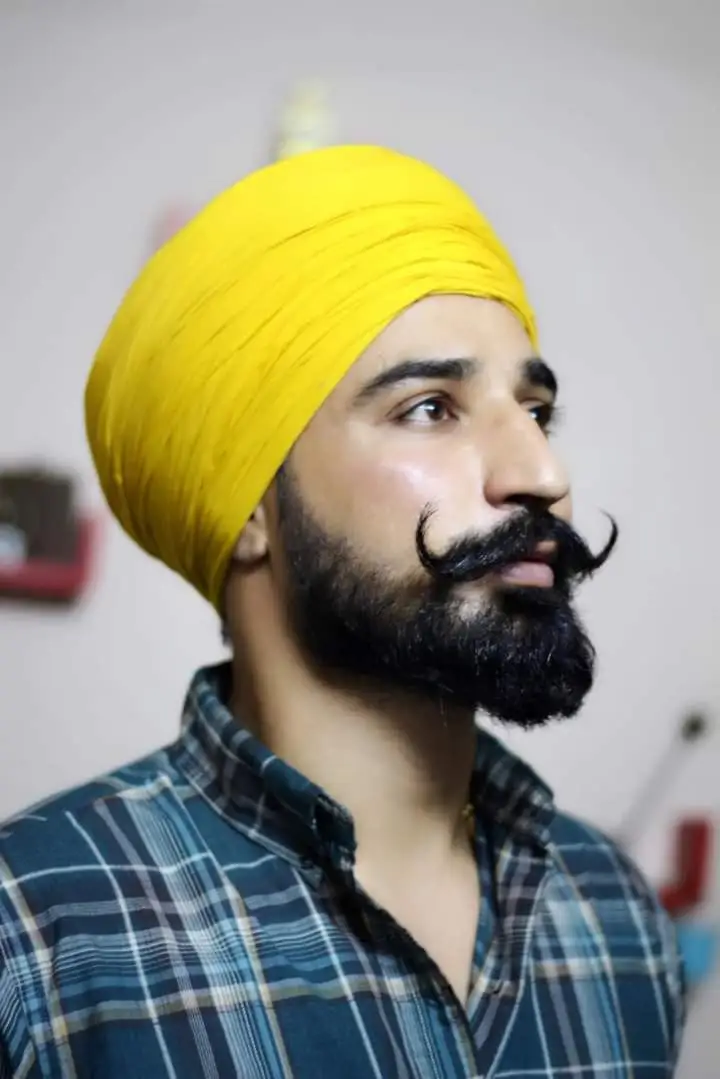

Personal information
- Nationality: Indian
- Born: Satinder Singh; 7 February 1987 (age 39)

Sport
- Sport: Track and field
- Event: 400 metre hurdles

Achievements and titles
- Personal best: 49.9 seconds
Medal record
Asian Championships
Bronze medal – third place	2013 Pune	400 metres hurdles
National Inter state Senior Athletic Championships
Gold medal – first place	2012 Hyderabad	400 metres hurdles

Satinder Singh (born 7 February 1987) is an Indian 400-meter hurdler. He hails from Jalandhar, Punjab, India. He won the gold medal in the 52nd National Inter-state Senior Athletic Championships, 2012 with a personal best timing of 49.99 seconds. He won a bronze medal in 20th Asian Athletic Championship, 2013.
