= Dmitriy Karpov =

Kazakhstani athletics competitor

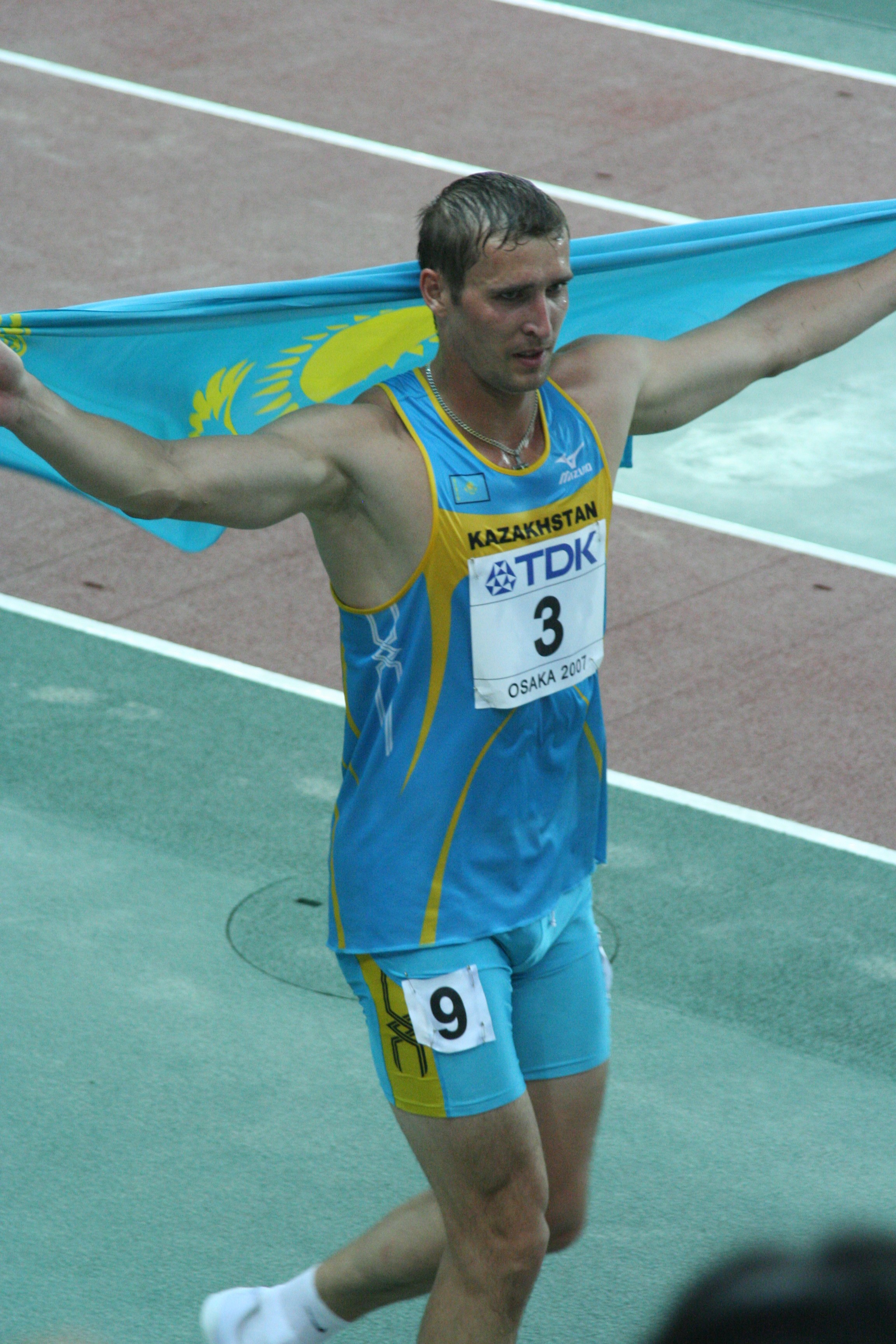

Personal information
- Nationality: Kazakhstan
- Born: Dmitriy Karpov; 23 July 1981 (age 44) Karaganda, Kazakh SSR, USSR
- Education: Karaganda State University
- Height: 1.98 m (6 ft 6 in)
- Weight: 98 kg (216 lb)
- Spouse: Irina Karpova
- Parent(s): Vera Karpova, Vasily Karpov

Sport
- Sport: Athletics
- Event: Decathlon
- Personal best(s): Decathlon: 8,725 (2004); Heptathlon: 6,229 (2008)

Dmitriy Vasilyevich Karpov (Дмитрий Васильевич Карпов; born 23 July 1981) is a retired Kazakhstani athlete who competes in decathlon and heptathlon (the latter during the winter season). He won the bronze medal in the 2004 Summer Olympics.

== Personal bests ==
Information from World Athletics profile unless otherwise noted.

=== Indoor ===
As of 11 July 2025

| Event | Performance | Location | Date |
|---|---|---|---|
| Long jump | 7.86 m (25 ft 9 1/4 in) | Moscow | 31 Jan 2002 |
| 60 metres hurdles | 7.79 | Moscow | 23 Feb 2003 |
| Shot put | 15.78 m (51 ft 9 1/4 in) | Karaganda | 25 Feb 2007 |

| Event | Performance | Location | Date | Points |
|---|---|---|---|---|
| Heptathlon | —N/a | Tallinn | 15–16 Feb 2008 | 6,229 points |
| 60 meters | 7.03 | Moscow | 8 Feb 2004 | 872 points |
| Long jump | 7.99 m (26 ft 2 1/2 in) | Moscow | 8 Feb 2004 | 1,058 points |
| Shot put | 16.26 m (53 ft 4 in) | Hangzhou | 12 Feb 2012 | 867 points |
| High jump | 2.11 m (6 ft 11 in) | Karaganda | 7 Feb 2002 | 906 points |
| 60 meters hurdles | 7.79 | Moscow | 23 Feb 2003 | 1,035 points |
| Pole vault | 5.20 m (17 ft 1/2 in) | Valencia | 9 Mar 2008 | 972 points |
| 1000 meters | 2:42.34 | Budapest | 7 Mar 2004 | 848 points |
| Virtual Best Performance | | | | 6,558 points |

=== Outdoor ===
As of 11 July 2025

| Event | Performance | Location | Date |
|---|---|---|---|
| Long jump | 8.05 m (26 ft 4 3/4 in) (+1.2 m/s) | Almaty | 23 Jun 2002 |
| 110 metres hurdles | 13.93 (+0.5 m/s) | Almaty | 10 May 2003 |
| Shot put | 16.05 m (52 ft 7 3/4 in) | Almaty | 4 Jul 2007 |
| Discus throw | 52.80 m (173 ft 2 1/2 in) | Minsk | 31 Jul 2004 |

| Event | Performance | Location | Date | Points |
|---|---|---|---|---|
| Decathlon | —N/a | Athens | 23–24 Aug 2004 | 8,725 points |
| 100 meters | 10.69 (+0.8 m/s) | Ratingen | 24 Jun 2006 | 931 points |
| 100 meters | 10.50 (+2.2 m/s) | Athens | 23 Aug 2004 | —N/a |
| Long jump | 7.81 (-0.5 m/s) | Athens | 23 Aug 2004 | 1,012 points |
| Shot put | 16.95 m (55 ft 7 1/4 in) | Guangzhou | 24 Nov 2010 | 910 points |
| High jump | 2.12 m (6 ft 11 1/4 in) | Desenzano del Garda | 10 May 2003 | 915 points |
| 400 meters | 46.81 | Athens | 23 Aug 2004 | 968 points |
| 110 meters hurdles | 13.97 (+0.9 m/s) | Desenzano del Garda | 12 May 2002 | 978 points |
| Discus throw | 52.33 m (171 ft 8 in) | Götzis | 30 May 2004 | 919 points |
| Pole vault | 5.30 m (17 ft 4 1/2 in) | Götzis | 1 Jun 2008 | 1,004 points |
| Javelin throw | 60.31 m (197 ft 10 1/4 in) | Ratingen | 25 Jun 2006 | 743 points |
| 1500 meters | 4:32.34 | Ratingen | 25 Jun 2006 | 729 points |
| Virtual Best Performance | | | | 9,109 points |

== Achievements ==
| Year | Competition | Venue | Position | Event | Notes |
Representing Kazakhstan
| 1999 | Asian Junior Championships | Singapore | 4th | Decathlon | 6714 pts |
| 2000 | World Junior Championships | Santiago, Chile | 4th | Decathlon | 7366 pts |
| 2001 | East Asian Games | Osaka, Japan | 1st | Decathlon | 7567 pts |
| 2002 | Asian Championships | Colombo, Sri Lanka | 5th | 110 m hurdles | 14.47 s |
| 2002 | Asian Championships | Colombo, Sri Lanka | 8th | Long jump | 7.70 m |
| 2002 | Asian Games | Busan, South Korea | 2nd | Decathlon | 7995 pts |
| 2003 | World Championships | Paris, France | 3rd | Decathlon | 8374 pts |
| 2004 | World Indoor Championships | Budapest, Hungary | 4th | Heptathlon | 6155 pts |
| 2004 | Olympic Games | Athens, Greece | 3rd | Decathlon | 8725 pts (AR) |
| 2005 | World Championships | Helsinki, Finland | – | Decathlon | DNF |
| 2006 | Asian Games | Doha, Qatar | 1st | Decathlon | 8384 pts |
| 2007 | World Championships | Osaka, Japan | 3rd | Decathlon | 8565 pts |
| 2008 | World Indoor Championships | Valencia, Spain | 3rd | Heptathlon | 6131 pts |
| 2008 | Olympic Games | Beijing, China | – | Decathlon | DNF |
| 2009 | Asian Indoor Games | Hanoi, Vietnam | 2nd | Heptathlon | 5691 pts |
| 2009 | World Championships | Berlin, Germany | 21st | Decathlon | 7952 pts |
| 2010 | Asian Games | Guangzhou, China | 1st | Decathlon | 8026 pts |
| 2011 | World Championships | Daegu, South Korea | 21st | Decathlon | 7550 pts |
| 2012 | Asian Indoor Championships | Hangzhou, China | 1st | Heptathlon | 5928 pts |
| 2012 | Olympic Games | London, United Kingdom | 18th | Decathlon | 7926 pts |
| 2013 | Asian Championships | Pune, India | 1st | Decathlon | 8037 pts |
| 2013 | World Championships | Moscow, Russia | – | Decathlon | DNF |
| 2014 | Asian Indoor Championships | Hangzhou, China | 1st | Heptathlon | 5752 pts |
| 2014 | Asian Games | Incheon, South Korea | 4th | Decathlon | 7749 pts |
