= Bharatinder Singh =

Indian decathlete

Personal information
- Full name: Bharatinder Singh Cheema
- Nationality: Indian
- Born: 23 October 1988 (age 37) Haryana, India
- Height: 1.89 m (6 ft 2 1/2 in)
- Weight: 100 kg (220 lb)

Sport
- Country: India
- Sport: Track and field
- Event: Decathlon
- Team: Haryana
- Now coaching: Ranjeet Randhawa

Achievements and titles
- Personal best(s): outdoor: 7658 pts (12 June 2011, Indian record)

Bharatinder Singh (born 23 October 1988) is an Indian track and field athlete from Haryana who specializes in decathlon. Bharatinder set the Indian National record of 7,658 points during the 51st National Senior Inter-State Athletics Championship held in Bangalore on 12 June 2011. He broke Jora Singh's previous mark of 7,502 points, registered in New Delhi in August 2006.

In 2014, he received the Bhim Award, the highest award for sports in Haryana.

== Performance during the National record ==
The following table shows Harish yadav performance in the individual events when he set the Indian national record.

Events	Performance
100m	10.83 s
Long jump	7.45 m
Shot put	14.67 m
High jump	1.95 m
400m	49.83 s
110m Hurdles	15.27 s
Discus throw	48.71 m
Pole vault	4.00 m
Javelin throw	62.85 m
1500m	5:24.18
Decathlon	7658
