= Jan Felix Knobel =

German decathlete (born 1989)

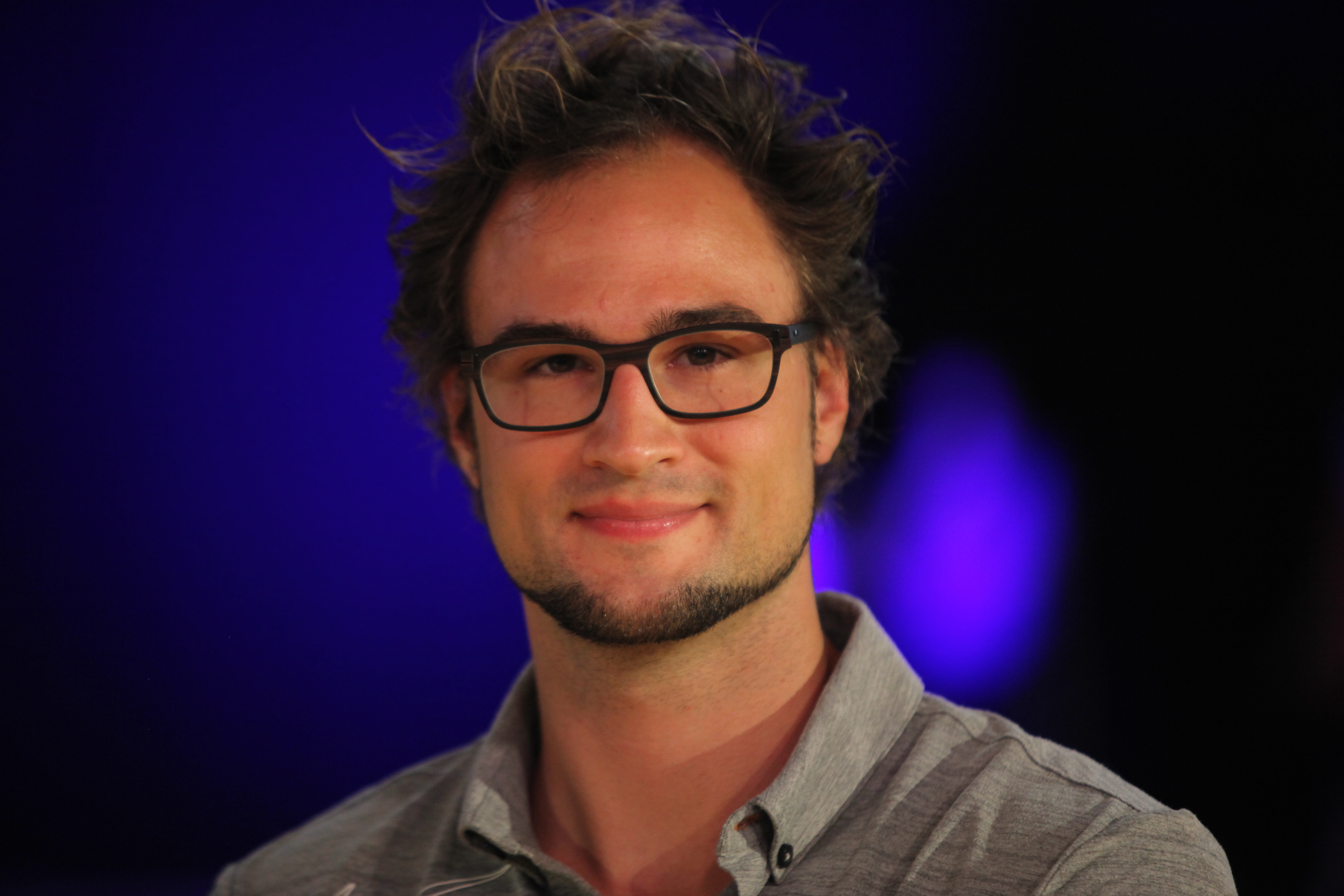
- Knobel in 2014

Personal information
- Born: 16 January 1989 (age 37) Bad Homburg vor der Höhe, West Germany
Medal record
Men's decathlon
Representing Germany
World Junior Championships
Gold medal – first place	2008 Bydgoszcz	Decathlon

Jan Felix Knobel (born 16 January 1989) is a German retired decathlete.

He finished fifth at the 2005 World Youth Championships. At the 2008 World Junior Championships in Bydgoszcz he won the title with 7896 points in the decathlon. The final margin of victory over Belarusian Eduard Mikhan was only two points.

At the German Championships in 2009, Knobel took part in the senior class, although he would have been eligible to start in the juniors, and secured the victory with 7738 points.

Knobel's personal best is 8288 points, which he reached the end of May 2011 at the 2011 Hypo-Meeting in Götzis. Shortly after, he started as a co-favorite at the 2011 European U23 Championships in Ostrava. After a fall in the 110-meter hurdles he had to bury all medal hopes. Even the final 1500-meter race, he did not finish and ended up with 6774 points in 19th place.

He peaked his career with an eighth place at the 2011 World Championships. He subsequently did not finish the 2012 Olympic decathlon, and nor the 2013 Summer Universiade either.

Since 2005, Knobel has competed for the athletics department of Eintracht Frankfurt and is coached by Jürgen Sammert. He studied architecture at the RheinMain University of Applied Sciences.
