= IT cluster Rhine-Main-Neckar =

IT cluster in Europe

The IT cluster Rhine-Main-Neckar, also known as Silicon Valley of Germany, is one of the most important locations of the IT and high-tech industry worldwide. It is concentrated in the Rhine-Main and Rhine-Neckar metropolitan regions. The IT cluster Rhine-Main-Neckar is the largest IT cluster in Europe. 50 percent of the worldwide revenue of the hundred largest European software companies is generated by companies in this region. The Rhine-Main-Neckar region also has one of the most important biopharmaceutical, fintech, finance and consulting clusters in Europe.

In addition to universities such as Technische Universität Darmstadt and University of Frankfurt and research institutions such as the German Research Center for Artificial Intelligence and ATHENE, software companies such as SAP SE, Software AG and T-Systems also have their headquarters in the region.

== Importance in the world ==
In 2010, the French venture capital firm Truffle Capital published in its study "Truffle 100 European Clusters" that the Rhine-Main-Neckar region accounts for 50 percent of the worldwide revenue of the hundred largest European software providers. It compared the Rhine-Main-Neckar region as an IT cluster with Silicon Valley as the "Silicon Valley of Europe". According to this study, the Rhine-Main-Neckar IT cluster combined more than 12.5 billion euros in software-related sales in 2009. The next largest European IT cluster was Paris with 2.4 billion euros.

In a 2009 study, the region was compared with IT clusters such as Oulu (Finland), Bangalore (India) and Silicon Valley. In contrast to the Silicon Valley, the main business area of the companies in the region is enterprise software.

Location	Main business area	Size	Citizens	Employees	Companies	Revenue
Rhine-Main-Neckar	Business Software	5.000 km^{2} / 1930 mi^{2}	7,6 Mio.	80.000	8.000	42 billion
Silicon Valley (USA)	Soft- & Hardware	4.000 km^{2} / 1544 mi^{2}	2,3 Mio.	500.000	7.000	180 billion
Bangalore (India)	Software	500 km^{2} / 193 mi^{2}	5,0 Mio.	80.000	1.500	2 billion
Oulu (Finland)	Telecommunication	400 km^{2} /154 mi^{2}	0,13 Mio.	18.000	800	5 billion

According to a study by the European Commission, Darmstadt has the best cluster among all EU regions in the emerging industries. Emerging industries means future technologies that the EU attaches particular importance to for growth in Europe. Darmstadt also has the best biopharmaceutical cluster in Europe. The Rhineland-Palatinate region, which partly belongs to the Rhine-Main-Neckar region, ranks second among the biopharmaceutical clusters.

The region is one of the most important locations for IT security research worldwide. Darmstadt has the renowned ATHENE, the national center for research in security and privacy in Germany and the largest research institute for IT security in Europe. According to an analysis by Startup Genome, a company specialising in the analysis of startup ecosystems, the Rhine-Main region is also home to one of the world's most important startup ecosystems in the field of IT security and fintech.

== Importance in Germany ==
The IT cluster Rhein-Main-Neckar is part of the Spitzencluster Software-Cluster, which also includes other regions. In January 2010, the Software-Cluster won the German government's Spitzencluster competition, the equivalence to the German Universities Excellence Initiative for clusters. The cluster's goal is to enable the transformation of companies into digital companies. This cluster consists of the centers Darmstadt, Kaiserslautern, Karlsruhe, Saarbrücken and Walldorf. Since 2017, the German Federal Ministry of Education and Research has supported the cooperation between the German Research Center for Artificial Intelligence and the Technische Universität Darmstadt with companies and research institutions from Silicon Valley, Singapore and Bahia, Brazil.

In a competition, the Federal Association for Information Technology, Telecommunications and New Media awarded Darmstadt the title of Digital City in 2017. This victory is intended to turn Darmstadt into a digital model city. In 2016, the Federal Ministry of Finance decided to make the region around Darmstadt the pre-eminent hub for the digital transformation of the economy.

According to a study by the auditing firm Ernst & Young from 2018, 24% of all Fintechs in Germany have settled in the Rhine-Main-Neckar region, with Frankfurt being considered the centre. This makes the Rhine-Main-Neckar region one of the most important locations for the fintech industry in Germany.

According to a study from 2013, the Rhine-Main region has the best cluster in Germany in the financial and consulting industry.

According to the German Research Foundation (DFG), the Technische Universität Darmstadt (TU Darmstadt) is one of the best universities in Germany in terms of research in computer science and the University of Mainz in the natural sciences. According to the report of the German Research Foundation (DFG) from 2018, in the period under review from 2014 to 2016 the TU Darmstadt received the highest number of competitive grants in the field of computer science and the University of Mainz the highest number of competitive grants in the natural sciences. In a competitive selection process, the DFG selects the best research projects from researchers at universities and research institutes and finances them. The ranking is thus regarded as an indicator of the quality of research. In a nationwide competition by the Federal Ministry of Economics and Energy, the Technische Universität Darmstadt was honoured as founding university.

== Resident universities ==
- Technische Universität Darmstadt
- University of Frankfurt
- University of Mannheim
- University of Mainz
- University of Applied Sciences Mainz
- Darmstadt University of Applied Sciences
- Frankfurt University of Applied Sciences
- RheinMain University of Applied Sciences
- Technische Universität Kaiserslautern
- University of Applied Sciences Worms

The Karlsruhe Institute of Technology is not located directly in the IT-Cluster Rhine-Main-Neckar, but is adjacent to it and has nevertheless contributed to its development.

== Resident companies (selection) ==
- SAP
- Software AG
- DE-CIX
- Merck Group
- Microsoft Germany
- Oracle Germany
- IBM Germany
- Rakuten Kobo Inc. Germany
- Nemetschek
- Airbus
- Opel
- Accenture
- Capgemini
- Computer Sciences Corporation
- Crytek
- Fujitsu Semiconductor Europe
- Isra Vision
- Kalypso Media
- MAXON
- Schott AG
- Singulus Technologies
- T-Systems
- Terma A/S
- TrekStor
- United Internet

== Resident research institutes (selection) ==
- German Research Centre for Artificial Intelligence
- GSI Helmholtz Centre for Heavy Ion Research
- European Space Operations Centre
- European Organisation for the Exploitation of Meteorological Satellites
- ATHENE
- Center for IT Security, Privacy and Accountability

== See also ==
- Silicon Saxony
- Isar Valley
- German Silicon Valley (disambiguation)
