= German Silicon Valley =

German Silicon Valley may refer to various technology clusters and associations in Germany.

- WISTA Science and Technology Park, Berlin-Adlershof
- IT cluster Rhine-Main-Neckar, in the Rhine-Main and Rhine-Neckar regions
- Silicon Allee, Berlin
- Isar Valley, Munich, Bavaria
- Silicon Saxony, Dresden, Saxony, Elbe river valley around the city
- Solar Valley, Thalheim, Saxony-Anhalt
- German International School of Silicon Valley, California

== See also ==
- List of places with "Silicon" names
- List of technology centers
