= Isar Valley =

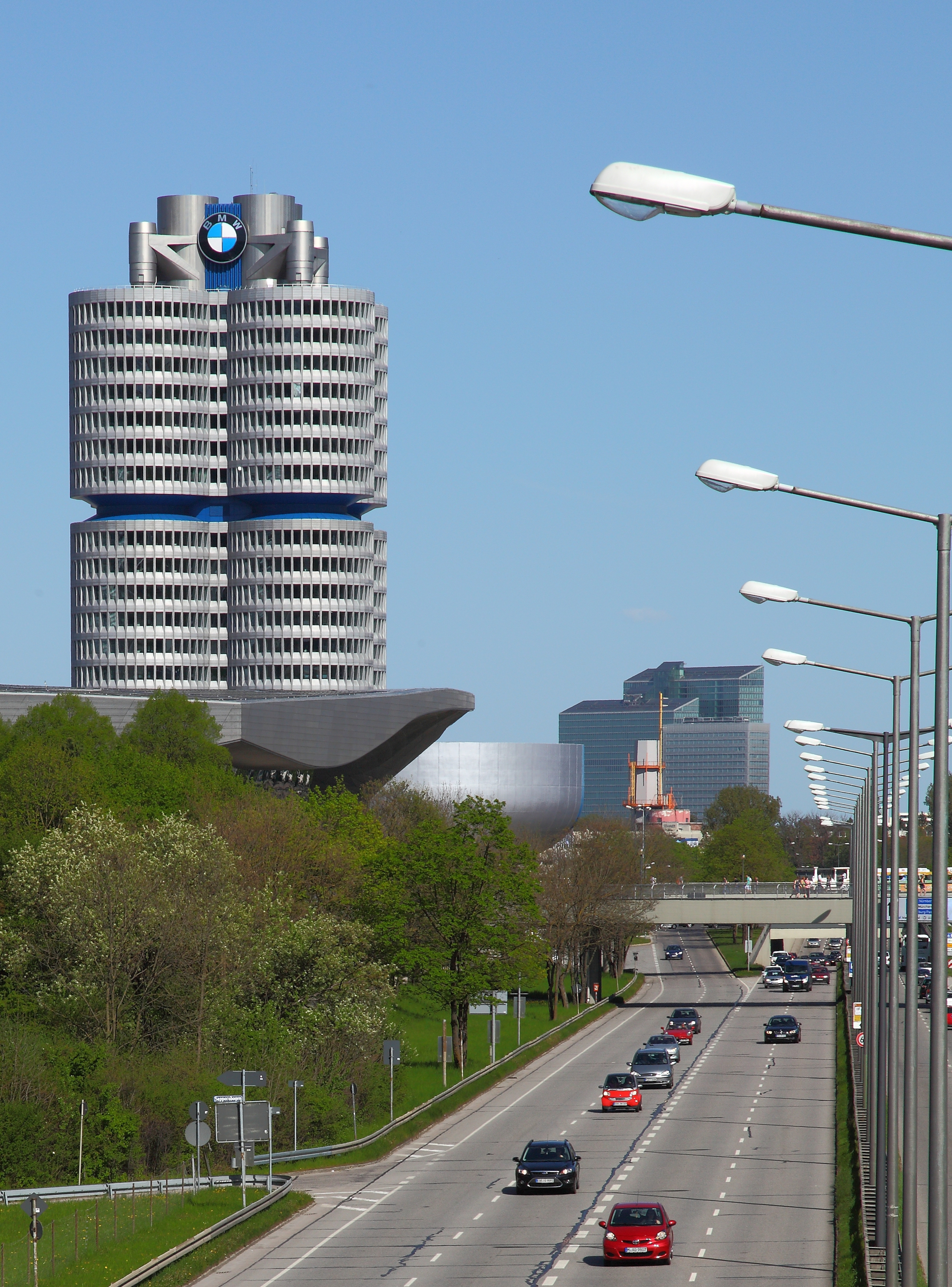
Munich is a major IT and high-tech hub.

Isar Valley is an unofficial name for the Munich Region as a hub for IT, microelectronics, and high technology. The name was inspired by Silicon Valley in California, the most important location for the IT industry worldwide. The greater Munich area is one of the most important locations for the ITC industry in Germany. At the end of 2010, there were over 29,000 companies in the IT sector there, with a total of over 230,000 employee. According to the Technical University of Munich, the region is Germany's most important IT location. A study by the European Commission identified the Munich area as the leading IT location in Europe in 2014.

== History ==
Siemens, based in Munich since 1949, entered the computer and semiconductor industry in the 1950s, developing the Siemens 2002 computer, for example. In 1962, the Leibniz Computing Center was founded in Munich, followed in 1971 by the company Softlab, which later became important (but no longer exists today). Companies such as Infineon and Gigaset were spun off from Siemens. Fujitsu Technology Solutions also emerged from the former joint venture Fujitsu Siemens Computers. Since the 1990s in particular, the region has increasingly developed into a globally important location for the IT industry as part of the High-Tech Offensive Bavaria, benefiting from numerous support programs and settlement initiatives under the staten government of Edmund Stoiber. In addition, the Munich area is home to three major universities, namely LMU Munich, Technical University of Munich, and Munich University of Applied Sciences, and consequently has a high number of qualified graduates.

A study from 2001 ranked the “Isar Valley” as the fourth most important IT location worldwide, after Silicon Valley, the Greater Boston area, and on par with Tel Aviv (Silicon Wadi). Munich has since maintained its status as one of the world's leading IT locations. In 2012, Munich was also home to the most powerful supercomputer in Europe, the SuperMUC. With over 3,000 patent applications (2020), Munich is the German city with the most patents and Bavaria the leading region in Europe.

In 2019, the high-tech offensive continued with the High-Tech Agenda Bavaria, which supports future technologies and research with billions in government funding. To this end, 13,000 additional university places and 3,800 new jobs in science and research are to be created, and around 1,000 new professorships established at Bavarian universities, particularly in key areas such as artificial intelligence (AI), clean tech, and aerospace.

Munich also has one of the leading start-up ecosystems in Europe. In 2024, Bavaria even surpassed the German capital Berlin in terms of venture capital raised (2.3 billion Euro).

== Companies ==
The following companies have their headquarters in or near Munich:

- Allgeier SE
- ADVA Optical Networking
- Allianz Technology
- Absolut Radio
- ASM Assembly Systems
- Atoss
- Atradius
- BMW
- Brainlab
- Cancom
- Caixabank
- Celemony Software
- Centrosolar Group
- Check24
- EOS
- Electrola
- ESL Aequitas
- Eurohypo
- Fitch Ratings
- TDK Electronics
- ESG
- Fujitsu Technology Solutions
- Giesecke & Devrient
- Gutefrage.net
- IABG
- IBM Watson Center
- Infineon
- NTT Security
- Lantiq
- msg systems
- MorphoSys
- Munich Re
- Mutares
- MTU Aero Engines
- Nemetschek
- NorCom
- Noventi
- Protectas Group
- Rohde & Schwarz
- SES Platform Services
- SHS VIVEON
- Siemens
- Siltronic
- Scout24 Holding
- Softing
- Süss Microtec
- Telefónica Germany
- Travian Games
- Transdev Rail
- TÜV Süd
- TQ-Systems
- Unify
- YKK Fasteners

In addition, Munich is home to numerous other branches of internationally active IT and high-tech companies, such as the German headquarters of Acronis, Adobe, Airbus, Amazon Web Services, AMD, Apple, ASML, Atos, Cadence, Cisco Systems, Google, Hitachi, Hewlett Packard, IBM, Intel, Klarna, McAfee, Microchip Technology, Microsoft, Nokia Solutions and Networks, NTT Data, Oracle, Realtek, Samsung Group, T-Systems and VMware.

== See also ==
- IT-Cluster Rhein-Main-Neckar
- Silicon Saxony
