= Athletics at the 2013 Summer Universiade – Men's decathlon =

The men's decathlon event at the 2013 Summer Universiade was held on 8–9 July.

== Medalists ==
Gold	Silver	Bronze
Thomas Van Der Plaetsen; Belgium	Sergey Sviridov; Russia	Brent Newdick; New Zealand

== Results ==
=== 100 metres ===
Wind:
Heat 1: +0.1 m/s, Heat 2: -0.5 m/s

Rank	Heat	Name	Nationality	Time	Points	Notes
1	2	Sergey Sviridov	Russia	11.03	854	FS1
2	1	Jānis Jansons	Latvia	11.07	845	FS1
3	1	Thomas Van Der Plaetsen	Belgium	11.12	834	
4	2	Maximilian Gilde	Germany	11.23	810	
5	2	Jan Felix Knobel	Germany	11.26	804	
6	2	Henrik Holmberg	Norway	11.31	791	
7	1	Roman Garibay	Mexico	11.35	784	
8	2	Brent Newdick	New Zealand	11.36	782	
9	1	Vasiliy Kharlamov	Russia	11.42	769	
10	2	Lars Rise	Norway	11.49	755	
11	1	Pat Arbour	Canada	11.63	725	

=== Long jump ===
Rank	Athlete	Nationality	#1	#2	#3	Result	Points	Notes	Total
1	Thomas Van Der Plaetsen	Belgium	7.80	x	–	7.80	1010		1844
2	Maximilian Gilde	Germany	7.41	7.34	7.12	7.41	913		1723
3	Sergey Sviridov	Russia	7.10	7.23	7.26	7.26	876		1730
4	Brent Newdick	New Zealand	7.17	7.19	x	7.19	859		1641
5	Jan Felix Knobel	Germany	x	x	7.17	7.17	854		1658
6	Vasiliy Kharlamov	Russia	x	6.92	7.07	7.07	830		1599
7	Jānis Jansons	Latvia	x	x	7.00	7.00	814		1659
8	Henrik Holmberg	Norway	6.95	6.94	x	6.95	802		1593
9	Lars Rise	Norway	6.85	6.54	6.73	6.85	778		1533
10	Pat Arbour	Canada	x	6.74	6.68	6.74	753		1478
11	Roman Garibay	Mexico	6.57	6.72	6.47	6.72	748		1532

=== Shot put ===
Rank	Athlete	Nationality	#1	#2	#3	Result	Points	Notes	Total
1	Jan Felix Knobel	Germany	15.29	15.74	16.00	16.00	851		2509
2	Lars Rise	Norway	15.05	14.76	15.33	15.33	810		2343
3	Vasiliy Kharlamov	Russia	14.58	x	14.70	14.70	771		2370
4	Pat Arbour	Canada	14.01	14.57	x	14.57	763		2241
5	Jānis Jansons	Latvia	13.81	14.39	x	14.39	752		2411
6	Sergey Sviridov	Russia	14.23	14.21	14.06	14.23	742		2472
7	Brent Newdick	New Zealand	13.22	12.94	13.73	13.73	712		2353
8	Thomas Van Der Plaetsen	Belgium	13.35	12.24	13.48	13.48	697		2541
9	Roman Garibay	Mexico	13.40	x	13.30	13.40	692		2224
10	Maximilian Gilde	Germany	12.36	12.77	13.24	13.24	682		2405
11	Henrik Holmberg	Norway	x	x	12.02	12.02	608		2201

=== High jump ===
Rank	Athlete	Nationality	1.74	1.80	1.83	1.86	1.89	1.92	1.95	1.98	2.01	2.04	2.07	2.10	2.13	Result	Points	Notes	Total
1	Jānis Jansons	Latvia	–	–	–	–	o	o	o	o	o	xxo	xxo	o	xxx	2.10	896		3307
2	Thomas Van Der Plaetsen	Belgium	–	–	–	–	–	–	o	–	o	o	xo	xxx		2.07	868		3409
3	Henrik Holmberg	Norway	–	–	–	–	xo	o	xo	o	xxo	xxx				2.01	813		3014
4	Sergey Sviridov	Russia	–	–	–	o	xo	o	xo	xxo	xxo	r				2.01	813		3285
5	Brent Newdick	New Zealand	–	o	–	o	o	xo	o	xxo	xxx					1.98	785		3138
6	Lars Rise	Norway	–	–	o	–	o	xxo	o	xxo	xxx					1.98	785		3128
7	Pat Arbour	Canada	–	o	xo	o	o	xxx								1.89	705		2946
7	Roman Garibay	Mexico	o	o	xo	o	o	xxx								1.89	705		2929
9	Vasiliy Kharlamov	Russia	–	–	o	o	xo	xxx								1.89	705		3075
10	Jan Felix Knobel	Germany	–	–	o	o	xxx									1.86	679		3188
11	Maximilian Gilde	Germany	–	xo	o	xxx										1.83	653		3058

=== 400 metres ===
Rank	Heat	Name	Nationality	Time	Points	Notes	Total
1	1	Henrik Holmberg	Norway	49.23	850		3864
2	1	Sergey Sviridov	Russia	49.31	847		4132
3	2	Thomas Van Der Plaetsen	Belgium	49.36	844		4253
4	2	Maximilian Gilde	Germany	50.11	810		3868
5	1	Lars Rise	Norway	50.55	789		3917
6	2	Roman Garibay	Mexico	50.64	785		3714
7	1	Vasiliy Kharlamov	Russia	50.70	783		3858
8	1	Brent Newdick	New Zealand	51.19	761		3899
9	2	Jānis Jansons	Latvia	51.66	740		4047
10	2	Pat Arbour	Canada	53.00	682		3628
	2	Jan Felix Knobel	Germany	DNS	0		DNF

=== 110 metres hurdles ===
Wind:
Heat 1: +0.3 m/s, Heat 2: -0.3 m/s

Rank	Lane	Name	Nationality	Time	Points	Notes	Total
1	2	Jānis Jansons	Latvia	14.55	905		4952
2	1	Thomas Van Der Plaetsen	Belgium	14.77	878		5131
3	2	Maximilian Gilde	Germany	14.92	859		4727
4	2	Vasiliy Kharlamov	Russia	14.94	857		4715
5	2	Pat Arbour	Canada	15.29	815		4443
6	1	Sergey Sviridov	Russia	15.43	798		4930
6	2	Roman Garibay	Mexico	15.43	798		4512
8	1	Brent Newdick	New Zealand	15.60	778		4677
9	2	Henrik Holmberg	Norway	15.74	762		4626
10	1	Lars Rise	Norway	16.14	717		4634

=== Discus throw ===
Rank	Athlete	Nationality	#1	#2	#3	Result	Points	Notes	Total
1	Pat Arbour	Canada	x	46.54	47.64	47.64	821		5264
2	Sergey Sviridov	Russia	x	47.06	x	47.06	809		5739
3	Jānis Jansons	Latvia	43.09	x	44.66	44.66	760		5712
4	Brent Newdick	New Zealand	44.04	43.83	x	44.04	747		5424
5	Vasiliy Kharlamov	Russia	42.76	42.57	x	42.76	721		5436
6	Lars Rise	Norway	42.05	x	x	42.05	706		5340
7	Roman Garibay	Mexico	40.38	40.30	40.41	40.41	673		5185
8	Thomas Van Der Plaetsen	Belgium	x	38.74	38.45	38.74	639		5770
9	Maximilian Gilde	Germany	36.15	37.17	36.16	37.17	607		5334
10	Henrik Holmberg	Norway	34.53	35.75	32.90	35.75	579		5205

=== Pole vault ===
Rank	Athlete	Nationality	3.50	3.60	3.70	3.80	3.90	4.00	4.10	4.20	4.30	4.40	4.50	4.60	4.70	4.80	5.00	5.10	5.20	5.30	Result	Points	Notes	Total
1	Thomas Van Der Plaetsen	Belgium	–	–	–	–	–	–	–	–	–	–	–	–	–	xo	o	o	xxo	xo	5.30	1004		6774
2	Brent Newdick	New Zealand	–	–	–	–	–	–	–	o	–	xo	o	o	xo	xxx					4.70	819		6243
3	Maximilian Gilde	Germany	–	–	–	–	–	–	o	–	xo	–	xo	–	xo	–	xxx				4.70	819		6153
4	Sergey Sviridov	Russia	–	–	–	–	–	–	–	xo	–	xo	o	xxx							4.50	760		6499
5	Roman Garibay	Mexico	o	–	o	xxo	o	xo	xo	xo	xxx										4.20	673		5858
6	Pat Arbour	Canada	–	–	–	–	–	–	o	xxo	xxx										4.20	673		5937
7	Jānis Jansons	Latvia	–	xo	–	xxo	–	o	o	xxo	xxx										4.20	673		6385
8	Lars Rise	Norway	–	–	–	–	–	xxo	–	xxx											4.00	617		5957
9	Henrik Holmberg	Norway	–	o	xxo	–	xxo	xxx													3.80	562		5767
	Vasiliy Kharlamov	Russia	–	–	–	–	–	–	–	–	–	–	–	xxx							NM	0		5436

=== Javelin throw ===
Rank	Athlete	Nationality	#1	#2	#3	Result	Points	Notes	Total
1	Lars Rise	Norway	61.64	68.98	63.47	68.98	874		6831
2	Roman Garibay	Mexico	65.18	66.01	64.67	66.01	829		6687
3	Sergey Sviridov	Russia	x	64.40	64.59	64.59	807		7306
4	Pat Arbour	Canada	62.96	63.34	61.83	63.34	788		6725
5	Thomas Van Der Plaetsen	Belgium	62.33	58.70	62.43	62.43	774		7548
6	Brent Newdick	New Zealand	52.48	59.18	53.68	59.18	726		6969
7	Maximilian Gilde	Germany	58.89	58.09	56.88	58.89	721		6874
8	Jānis Jansons	Latvia	44.39	x	44.81	44.81	512		6897
9	Henrik Holmberg	Norway	43.34	39.60	x	43.34	491		6258
	Vasiliy Kharlamov	Russia				DNS	0		DNF

=== 1500 metres ===
Rank	Name	Nationality	Time	Points	Notes
1	Lars Rise	Norway	4:36.90	700	
2	Roman Garibay	Mexico	4:44.41	653	
3	Maximilian Gilde	Germany	4:44.85	650	
4	Brent Newdick	New Zealand	4:46.21	642	
5	Sergey Sviridov	Russia	4:47.69	633	
6	Thomas Van Der Plaetsen	Belgium	4:50.48	616	
7	Henrik Holmberg	Norway	4:54.47	592	
8	Pat Arbour	Canada	5:08.00	515	
9	Jānis Jansons	Latvia	5:21.11	444	

=== Final standings ===
The highest mark recorded in each event is highlighted in yellow

Rank	Athlete	Nationality	100m	LJ	SP	HJ	400m	110m H	DT	PV	JT	1500m	Points	Notes
1st place, gold medalist(s)	Thomas Van Der Plaetsen	Belgium	11.12	7.80	13.48	2.07	49.36	14.77	38.74	5.30	62.43	4:50.48	8164	
2nd place, silver medalist(s)	Sergey Sviridov	Russia	11.03	7.26	14.23	2.01	49.31	15.43	47.06	4.50	64.59	4:47.69	7939	
3rd place, bronze medalist(s)	Brent Newdick	New Zealand	11.36	7.19	13.73	1.98	51.19	15.60	44.04	4.70	59.18	4:46.21	7611	
4	Lars Rise	Norway	11.49	6.85	15.33	1.98	50.55	16.14	42.05	4.00	68.98	4:36.90	7531	
5	Maximilian Gilde	Germany	11.23	7.41	13.24	1.83	50.11	14.92	37.17	4.70	58.89	4:44.85	7524	
6	Jānis Jansons	Latvia	11.07	7.00	14.39	2.10	51.66	14.55	44.66	4.20	44.81	5:21.11	7341	
7	Roman Garibay	Mexico	11.35	6.72	13.40	1.89	50.64	15.43	40.41	4.20	66.01	4:44.41	7340	
8	Pat Arbour	Canada	11.63	6.74	14.57	1.89	53.00	15.29	47.64	4.20	63.34	5:08.00	7240	
9	Henrik Holmberg	Norway	11.32	6.95	12.02	2.01	49.23	15.74	35.75	3.80	43.34	4:54.47	6850	
	Vasiliy Kharlamov	Russia	11.42	7.07	14.70	1.89	50.70	14.94	42.76	NM	DNS	–	DNF	
	Jan Felix Knobel	Germany	11.26	7.17	16.00	1.86	DNS	–	–	–	–	–	DNF	
