= Solar Valley (Germany) =

Industrial area in Germany

Coordinates: 51°38′30″N 12°13′20″E

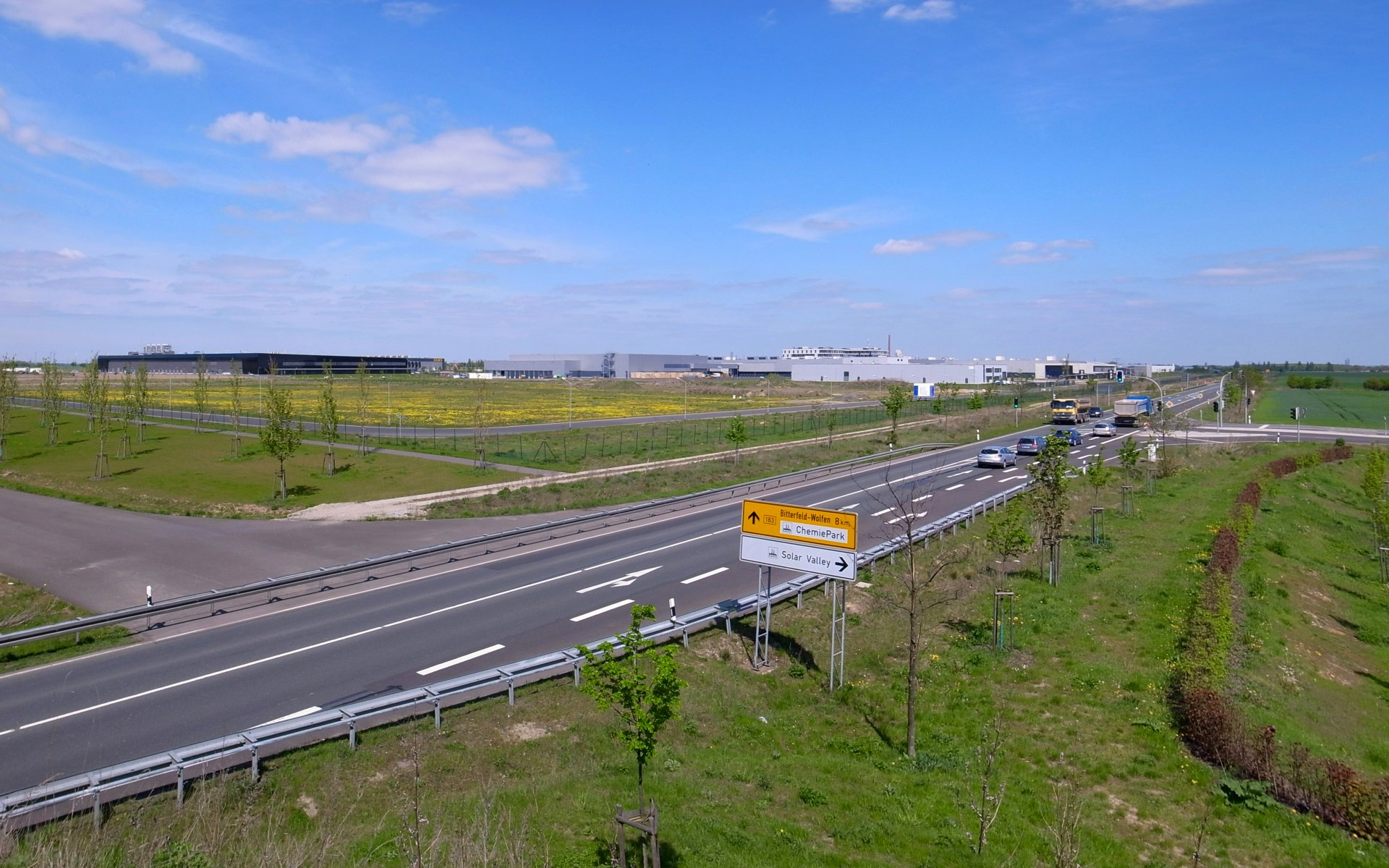
Solar Valley

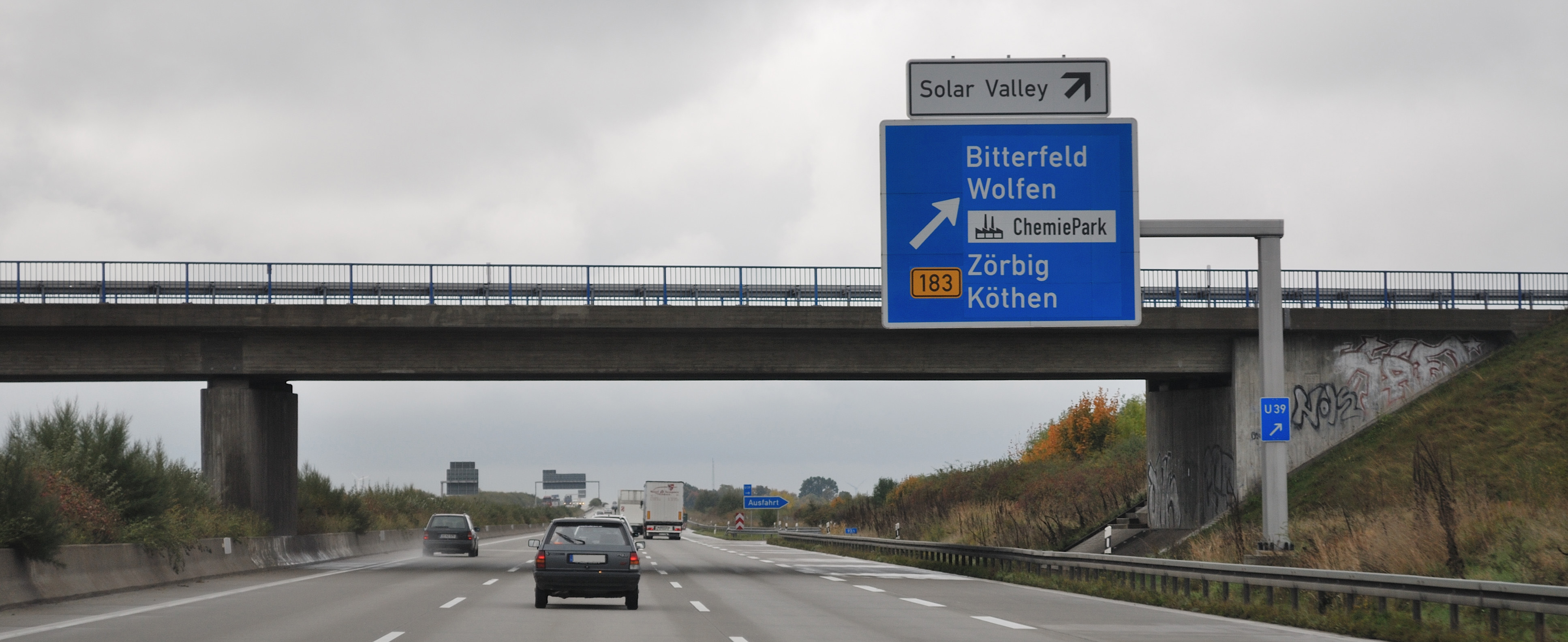
The Motorway 9 slip road to Solar Valley

Solar Valley is an industrial area in the Thalheim part of the municipality of Bitterfeld-Wolfen in the district Anhalt-Bitterfeld, Saxony-Anhalt, Germany. It is situated close to the Bundesautobahn 9 and the Leipzig/Halle Airport.

== Companies ==
There are production and storage facilities of different companies dealing in photovoltaics situated along the main road called "Sonnenallee".

All these companies are subsidiaries of, or suppliers to Hanwha Q Cells, which has its main engineering offices in Thalheim.

Main companies include:

- CSG Solar
- Hanwha Q Cells
- Meyer Burger
- Sontor
- Solibro
- Sovello

== See also ==
- German Silicon Valley
