= Sergey Sviridov =

Russian decathlete

Sergey Sviridov (born 20 October 1990 in Sverdlovsk) is a Russian decathlete. He competed in the decathlon at the 2012 Summer Olympics, finishing eighth.

== International competitions ==
Representing Russia
Year	Competition	Venue	Position	Event	Notes
2009	European Junior Championships	Novi Sad, Serbia	15th	Decathlon (Jr)	7069 pts
2012	Olympic Games	London, United Kingdom	8th	Decathlon	8219 pts
2013	Universiade	Kazan, Russia	2nd	Decathlon	7939 pts
2013	World Championships	Moscow, Russia	20th	Decathlon	7843 pts
2014	European Championships	Zürich, Switzerland	–	Decathlon	DNF
