= 2009 European Athletics U23 Championships – Men's decathlon =

The men's decathlon event at the 2009 European Athletics U23 Championships was held in Kaunas, Lithuania, at S. Dariaus ir S. Girėno stadionas (Darius and Girėnas Stadium) on 17 and 18 July.

== Medalists ==
| Gold | Eelco Sintnicolaas; Netherlands |
| Silver | Mateo Sossah; France |
| Bronze | Mihail Dudaš; Serbia |

== Results ==
=== Final ===
17-18 July

The highest mark recorded in each event is highlighted in yellow

| Rank | Name | Nationality | 100m | LJ | SP | HJ | 400m | 110m H | DT | PV | JT | 1500m | Points | Notes |
|---|---|---|---|---|---|---|---|---|---|---|---|---|---|---|
| 1st place, gold medalist(s) | Eelco Sintnicolaas | Netherlands | 11.08 (w: -1.7 m/s) | 7.29 (w: 1.7 m/s) | 13.39 | 1.91 | 48.22 | 14.81 (w: 0.2 m/s) | 40.52 | 5.30 | 61.51 | 4:27.64 | 8112 | |
| 2nd place, silver medalist(s) | Mateo Sossah | France | 11.69 (w: -1.1 m/s) | 7.27 (w: 1.3 m/s) | 13.67 | 2.09 | 49.23 | 14.57 (w: 0.2 m/s) | 45.44 | 4.10 | 60.27 | 4:24.12 | 7885 | |
| 3rd place, bronze medalist(s) | Mihail Dudaš | Serbia | 10.98 (w: -1.7 m/s) | 7.28 (w: 0.3 m/s) | 12.76 | 2.00 | 47.86 | 14.80 (w: 1.8 m/s) | 39.64 | 4.60 | 53.04 | 4:24.30 | 7855 | |
| 4 | Eduard Mikhan | Belarus | 11.10 (w: -1.7 m/s) | 7.36 (w: 1.7 m/s) | 13.59 | 1.91 | 48.54 | 15.06 (w: 1.8 m/s) | 41.36 | 4.60 | 52.63 | 4:23.77 | 7785 | |
| 5 | Aleksandr Zyabrev | Russia | 11.07 (w: -1.7 m/s) | 7.29 (w: 1.4 m/s) | 14.33 | 1.88 | 48.87 | 14.78 (w: 0.2 m/s) | 38.82 | 4.50 | 57.71 | 4:27.89 | 7779 | |
| 6 | Steffen Kahlert | Germany | 11.22 (w: -0.6 m/s) | 7.32 (w: 1.7 m/s) | 13.56 | 1.91 | 50.22 | 14.52 (w: -1.3 m/s) | 40.14 | 5.10 | 46.04 | 4:27.19 | 7740 | |
| 7 | Aigar Kukk | Estonia | 11.30 (w: -0.6 m/s) | 7.54 (w: 1.2 m/s) | 12.92 | 1.91 | 53.19 | 15.57 (w: 1.8 m/s) | 44.50 | 4.80 | 59.30 | 4:39.95 | 7594 | |
| 8 | Sami Itani | Finland | 11.37 (w: -0.6 m/s) | 6.78 w (w: 2.6 m/s) | 14.93 | 2.00 | 51.56 | 15.12 (w: 1.8 m/s) | 43.47 | 4.40 | 56.85 | 4:43.12 | 7527 | |
| 9 | Quentin Jammier | France | 11.69 (w: -1.1 m/s) | 6.94 (w: 0.8 m/s) | 13.63 | 1.94 | 49.65 | 15.25 (w: 1.8 m/s) | 39.02 | 4.50 | 57.32 | 4:21.67 | 7521 | |
| 10 | Rico Freimuth | Germany | 11.21 (w: -1.7 m/s) | 7.01 (w: 1.2 m/s) | 12.69 | 1.85 | 51.21 | 14.29 (w: 0.2 m/s) | 44.69 | 4.30 | 60.08 | 4:42.14 | 7513 | |
| 11 | Adam Nejedlý | Czech Republic | 11.34 (w: -1.7 m/s) | 7.38 (w: 1.6 m/s) | 12.50 | 2.03 | 50.47 | 14.44 (w: 0.2 m/s) | 38.03 | 4.50 | 48.76 | 4:40.40 | 7503 | |
| 12 | Gaël Quérin | France | 11.31 (w: -0.6 m/s) | 7.39 (w: 1.3 m/s) | 12.15 | 1.88 | 48.86 | 14.73 (w: 0.2 m/s) | 35.36 | 4.30 | 50.28 | 4:16.74 | 7463 | |
| 13 | Dawid Pyra | Poland | 11.46 (w: -1.1 m/s) | 6.92 (w: 0.9 m/s) | 12.96 | 1.97 | 49.99 | 14.76 (w: 1.8 m/s) | 36.97 | 4.80 | 50.82 | 4:36.02 | 7450 | |
| 14 | Bruno Carton-Delcourt | Belgium | 11.64 (w: -1.1 m/s) | 7.01 (w: 1.9 m/s) | 12.96 | 2.00 | 51.01 | 15.32 (w: -1.3 m/s) | 39.07 | 4.70 | 49.62 | 4:22.66 | 7428 | |
| 15 | David Sazima | Czech Republic | 11.43 (w: -0.6 m/s) | 6.90 (w: 1.2 m/s) | 11.87 | 2.03 | 50.58 | 14.85 (w: -1.3 m/s) | 33.57 | 4.90 | 57.26 | 4:47.19 | 7391 | |
| 16 | František Staněk | Czech Republic | 11.73 (w: -1.1 m/s) | 6.83 (w: 1.3 m/s) | 14.58 | 1.94 | 52.27 | 14.93 (w: -1.3 m/s) | 40.90 | 5.10 | 55.04 | 5:04.00 | 7388 | |
| 17 | Jérémy Solot | Belgium | 11.36 (w: -1.7 m/s) | 6.98 (w: 1.5 m/s) | 13.15 | 1.91 | 50.95 | 15.10 (w: -1.3 m/s) | 39.21 | 4.40 | 50.39 | 5:11.13 | 7069 | |
| | Matthias Prey | Germany | 11.37 (w: -0.6 m/s) | 7.37 w (w: 2.1 m/s) | 14.14 | 1.85 | 50.73 | 15.11 (w: -1.3 m/s) | 44.98 | 4.30 | 55.17 | DNS | DNF | |
| | Mantas Šilkauskas | Lithuania | 10.85 (w: -1.7 m/s) | 7.59 (w: 0.4 m/s) | 12.02 | 1.94 | 49.57 | 14.52 (w: 0.2 m/s) | 41.24 | NM | DNS | | DNF | |
| | Lars Vikan Rise | Norway | 11.72 (w: -1.1 m/s) | 6.64 (w: 1.2 m/s) | DNS | | | | | | | | DNF | |

== Participation ==
According to an unofficial count, 20 athletes from 13 countries participated in the event.

- Belarus (1)
- Belgium (2)
- Czech Republic (3)
- Estonia (1)
- Finland (1)
- France (3)
- Germany (3)
- Lithuania (1)
- Netherlands (1)
- Norway (1)
- Poland (1)
- Russia (1)
- Serbia (1)
