= Silicon Saxony =

Registered industry association

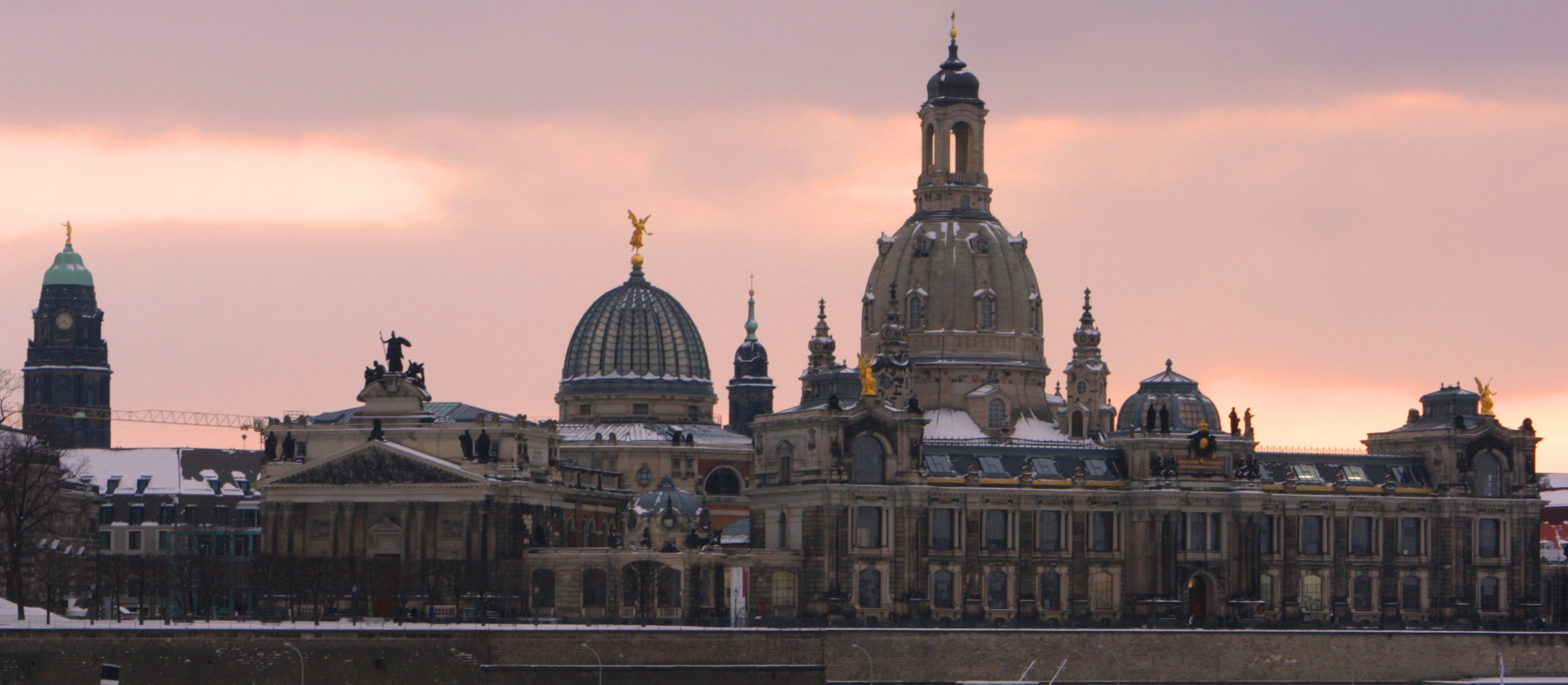
Dresden is the hub of Silicon Saxony.

Silicon Saxony is a registered industry association of some 600 companies in the microelectronics and high-tech sectors in the German state of Saxony. Many of those firms are situated in northern Dresden but some are near Leipzig. The term "Silicon Saxony" originated in a 1998 Time magazine article.

== Industrial fields ==
The companies develop and produce computer calculation and memory chips or new materials and electronics for solar companies. The developed and produced small semiconductors chips are used in all kinds of cars, mobile phones, TV sets and so on.

== History ==
Even before Germany's reunification, Dresden was a major center of microelectronics in the Eastern bloc with 3,500 employees. While mechanical engineering, which has a long history in the south of eastern Germany, suffered after the collapse of the Soviet Union, the microelectronics industry was, with public help from the state, one of the first industrial sectors in Saxony to recover. Although having many more employees today than before 1990, the sector is constantly under pressure because South Korea in particular is very keen to attract the industry.

Saxony and Germany are however bound to the competition laws of the European Union, but was able to keep and expand most of the research parts of the industry that it had started with. These parts are seen as successful, but also as very risky whenever a larger company has serious problems because the sector demands a high concentration of resources to succeed.

== Scientific environment ==
Dresden is a central city of Silicon Saxony and a technology center with Technical University (German TU) and ten other universities and semi-public institutes of applied technologies in many fields (for example the Max Planck Society, Fraunhofer Society, Leibniz institutes, Helmholtz Association and other German academic elite institutions).

== Members list ==
=== # ===
- 3D Infotainment Technologies UG
- 3D-Micromac AG
- 4source electronics Aktiengesellschaft

=== A ===
- A. Greitner Gebäudereinigung + Service GmbH
- ACCRETECH (Europe) GmbH
- Actemium Controlmatic Gesellschaft für Automation und Elektrotechnik mbH
- Adenso GmbH
- ADG Automatisierung Dresden GmbH
- advanced clean production Information Technology AG
- advanced data processing GmbH
- Advanced Mask Technology Center GmbH & Co.KG
- ADZ NAGANO GmbH
- AHC Oberflächentechnik GmbH
- Air Liquide Electronics
- Air Products GmbH
- AIS Automation Dresden GmbH
- ALLRESIST GmbH
- alpha microelectronics
- Alsco Berufsbekleidungs-Service GmbH
- AMEC e.V.
- Anvo-Systems Dresden GmbH
- Applied Materials GmbH
- aps Solutions GmbH
- arias GmbH
- ASML Germany GmbH
- aSpect Systems GmbH
- ASYS Automatic GmbH & Co. KG
- ATEip
- ATMEL Automotive GmbH
- ATMI GmbH
- ATT-Systems GmbH
- AUMO GmbH
- Avantgarde Labs GmbH
- Axcelis Technologies GmbH
- AZZURRO Semiconductors AG

=== B ===
- B.E.S.T. Fluidsysteme GmbH, Leipzig - Berlin
- Bildungsbüro Hochtechnologie
- BITKOM
- Brenntag GmbH
- Brooks Automation (Germany) GmbH
- Brooks Instrument GmbH
- Busch Semiconductor Vacuum Group B.V.
- buschmais GbR
- Businessplan - Wettbewerb Sachsen GmbH

=== C ===
- Cadence Design Systems GmbH
- camLine Dresden GmbH
- Carl Zeiss Innovationszentrum für Messtechnik
- Cascade Microtech GmbH
- Caterna GmbH
- Centrotherm Clean Solutions GmbH & Co. KG
- chip design
- cleanpart Dresden GmbH & Co. KG
- Cloud&Heat Technologies GmbH
- Cognex Germany
- CommSolid GmbH
- Communardo Software GmbH
- Community ITsax.de
- Compugraphics Jena GmbH
- CONVANIT GbR
- Creative Chips Dresden GmbH
- Critical Manufacturing Deutschland GmbH
- CS Clean Systems AG
- CSS GmbH Dresden
- CWE

=== D ===
- Danco Technik GmbH
- DAS Environmental Expert GmbH
- Dastex Reinraumzubehör GmbH & Co. KG
- DEAXO GmbH
- DELTA Mikroelektronik
- DERU Planungsgesellschaft für Energie-, Reinraum- und Umwelttechnik mbH
- Deutsche Solar GmbH
- DevBoost GmbH
- DFMSim Inc.
- DIAS Infrared GmbH
- Digades GmbH
- DIS AG
- DIW Mechanical Engineering GmbH & Co. KG
- DMOS GmbH
- docemos GmbH
- Dockweiler AG
- Dorfner KG
- Dream Chip Technologies GmbH
- DREEBIT GmbH
- DREMICUT GMBH
- Drescher, Prof. Kurt
- dresden elektronik ingenieurtechnik gmbh
- Dresden Informatik GmbH
- DTF Technology GmbH
- DUALIS GmbH IT Solution
- Dynamic Micro Systems Semiconductor Equipment GmbH

=== E ===
- EBARA Precision Machinery Europe GmbH
- edacentrum e.V.
- EDC Electronic Design Chemnitz GmbH
- Edwards GmbH
- ELMOS Semiconductor AG
- EMEC-Prototyping UG
- Entegris GmbH
- ERGO Umweltinstitut GmbH
- esb Rechtsanwälte
- etna GmbH; NL Sachsen
- Eurogrant GmbH
- Europäische Forschungsgesellschaft Dünne Schichten e.V.

=== F ===
- FAA Bildungsgesellschaft mbH, Südost
- Fab Owners Association
- Fachhochschule Lausitz
- FAP GmbH Dresden
- FCT Ingenieurkeramik GmbH
- FHR Anlagenbau GmbH
- Finetech GmbH & Co. KG
- Fraunhofer COMEDD
- Fraunhofer Technologiezentrum Halbleitermaterialien (THM)
- Fraunhofer-Institut für Elektronenstrahl- und Plasmatechnik (FEP)
- Fraunhofer-Institut für Elektronische Nanosysteme (ENAS)
- Fraunhofer-Institut für Integrierte Schaltungen IIS
- Fraunhofer-Institut für Keramische Technologien und Systeme (IKTS)
- Fraunhofer-Institut für Photonische Mikrosysteme (IPMS)
- Fraunhofer-Institut für Produktionstechnik und Automatisierung (IPA)
- Fraunhofer-Institut für Werkstoff und Strahltechnik (IWS)
- Fraunhofer-Institut für Zerstörungsfreie Prüfverfahren (IZFP)
- Fraunhofer-Institut für Zuverlässigkeit und Mikrointegration (IZM)
- Freiberg Instruments GmbH
- Freiberger Compound Materials GmbH
- Freiberger Silicium- und Targetbearbeitung GmbH
- FRT, Fries Research & Technology GmbH
- Fujifilm Electronic Materials (Europe) GmbH
- Fäth GmbH

=== G ===
- Gesellschaft zur Förderung von Wissenschaft und Wirtschaft - GFWW - e.V.
- Global Business Travel GmbH
- GLOBALFOUNDRIES Dresden
- Going International
- Greentech Germany Innovative
- Grundbesitz Hellerau GmbH
- GWT-TUD GmbH

=== H ===
- Hager + Elsässer S-Tec GmbH
- HAP GmbH Dresden
- HEIMANN Sensor GmbH
- Heliatek GmbH
- Helmholtz-Zentrum Dresden-Rossendorf e. V.
- high tech trade gmbh
- HighQ-Factory GmbH
- HighTech Startbahn (UG)
- Hilbert, Dirk
- Hilton Hotel Dresden
- Hochschule für Technik und Wirtschaft Dresden (FH)
- Horiba Europe GmbH
- HPS Handels GmbH
- HSEB Dresden GmbH

=== I ===
- I. K. Hofmann GmbH
- i.S.X. Software GmbH & Co. KG
- IBH IT-Service GmbH
- Infineon Technologies Dresden GmbH
- Infobroking Schwanecke Dresden
- InnoLas Semiconductor GmbH
- INNSIDE BY MELIA Dresden
- InQu Informatics GmbH
- Institut für Mikroelektronik- und Mechatronik-Systeme GmbH
- Intel Mobile Communications Technology Dresden GmbH
- Intelligente Sensorsysteme Dresden GmbH
- interface systems gmbh
- ION BEAM S.n.c
- IP GEN Rechte GmbH
- IQ Inspection & Qualification GmbH
- itemic AG

=== J ===
- Junghans, Prof. Dr. Bernd

=== K ===
- Kamp, Hendrik
- Kessler, Gerhard
- Kinetics Germany GmbH
- KLA-Tencor GmbH
- KPMG AG Wirtschaftsprüfungsgesellschaft
- Kurt Schwabe Institute for Sensor Technologies

=== L ===
- Landeshauptstadt Dresden
- Landgraf-Dietz, Prof. Dieter
- Leybold Optics Dresden GmbH
- Linde Electronics GmbH & Co. KG
- Lippert, Stachow & Partner

=== M ===
- M+W Integrated Solutions GmbH
- Maicom Quarz GmbH
- MAZeT GmbH
- MCRT GmbH
- me2c - [micro] electronic cluster
- Melexis Dresden GmbH
- memsfab GmbH
- Mentor Graphics (Deutschland) GmbH
- Mercateo AG
- Mercuri Urval GmbH
- MH Wassertechnologie GmbH
- MICA - Management in Crisis Agency
- MicroSystems GmbH
- Minitron elektronik gmbh
- MLP Finanzdienstleistungen AG
- MPD Microelectronic Packaging Dresden GmbH
- MSG Lithoglas GmbH
- MunEDA GmbH
- Murata Machinery GmbH - Dresden Branch

=== N ===
- NaMLab gGmbH
- Nanium S.A.
- newtron AG
- Nikon Precision Europe GmbH
- Novaled AG
- NXP Semiconductors Germany GmbH

=== O ===
- OC Oerlikon Corporation AG
- OptoNet e. V.
- Ortec Messe und Kongress GmbH
- Ostsächsische Sparkasse Dresden
- Overlack GmbH

=== P ===
- Pac Tech GmbH
- PALL GmbH
- Panalpina Welttransport (Deutschland) GmbH
- PEER Group GmbH
- Pfeiffer Vacuum GmbH
- Pfennig Reinigungstechnik GmbH
- Photronics MZD GmbH
- PICOBELLO Dr. Hielscher Computerservice
- Plasmetrex GmbH
- Plastic Logic GmbH — Dresden
- PMD Technologies AG
- PR-Piloten GmbH & Co. KG
- Prischmann, Dr. Werner
- Productivity Engineering Gesellschaft für Prozessintegration mbH
- profi-con GmbH
- ProTec Carrier Systems GmbH

=== Q ===
- qfmd GmbH
- Qoniac GmbH

=== R ===
- Rehak, Dr. Klaus
- Rehak, Dr. Wolfgang
- Reid Ashman Germany
- ReinraumAkademie GmbH
- RHe Microsystems GmbH
- RoodMicrotec GmbH
- Roth & Rau - Ortner GmbH
- Roth & Rau AG
- Rudolph Technologies Germany GmbH

=== S ===
- S-I-P GmbH
- Sachsen Bank
- Sachsen-Kälte GmbH
- SALT Solutions GmbH
- SAW COMPONENTS Dresden GmbH
- Saxonia Bildungsinstitut
- Saxonia Systems AG
- Schenker Technologies GmbH
- Schloss Wackerbarth
- Schneider + Partner GmbH
- Scholpp Montagetechnik GmbH
- SeeReal Technologies GmbH
- Semisol Analytik GmbH
- Semisystech S.r.l.
- SEMPA SYSTEMS GmbH
- SENTECH Instruments GmbH
- Serma GmbH
- SGS INSTITUT FRESENIUS GmbH
- Siemens AG
- Signalion GmbH
- Silicon Micro Sensors GmbH
- SILTECTRA GmbH
- Siltronic AG
- SMARTRAC TECHNOLOGY Dresden GmbH
- Solarwatt AG
- Solayer GmbH
- SolMateS B.V.
- SPEA GmbH
- SPTS Technologies GmbH
- SQL Projekt AG
- sstCONSULT
- STB Sachsenwind technische Beratungsgesellschaft mbH
- Steigenberger Hotel de Saxe
- SWAN Analytische Instrumente GmbH
- Synopsys GmbH
- SYSTEMA GmbH

=== T ===
- T-Systems Multimedia Solutions GmbH
- T.I.P.S. Messtechnik GmbH
- Tausch, Jürgen
- TechnologieZentrumDresden GmbH
- Teradyne GmbH
- Tokyo Electron Europe Limited
- Toppan Photomask Germany GmbH
- TU Bergakademie Freiberg
- TU Dresden, IAVT
- TU Dresden, IHM
- TU Dresden, Institut für Angewandte Informatik
- TU Dresden, Institut für Angewandte Photophysik
- TURCK duotec GmbH
- tyclipso.net

=== U ===
- UniTemp GmbH
- United Micro Technology

=== V ===
- VAT Deutschland GmbH
- Viering, Jentschura & Partner
- Vistec Electron Beam GmbH
- Vocke, H. Unternehmensberatung
- VON ARDENNE Anlagentechnik GmbH
- von Selchow, Thilo
- VOR Werbeagentur GmbH

=== W ===
- WAKU Robotics GmbH
- Watlow GmbH
- WBS TRAINING SE
- Weiss Klimatechnik GmbH
- WESSLING GmbH
- Westsächsische Hochschule Zwickau - University of Applied Sciences Zwickau
- Wirtschaftsförderung Sachsen GmbH
- Woowon Technologies Ltd.
- World Courier (Deutschland) GmbH

=== X ===
- X-Fab Semiconductor Foundries AG
- XENON Automatisierungstechnik GmbH
- xima media GmbH

=== Z ===
- Z&Z Werbeagentur
- Zentrum für Mikrotechnologien (ZFM)
- Zentrum Mikroelektronik Dresden AG
- znt Zentren für Neue Technologien GmbH

== See also ==
- German Silicon Valley (disambiguation)
