= Athletics at the 2012 Summer Olympics – Men's decathlon =

Men's decathlon at the Games of the XXX Olympiad
- Venue: Olympic Stadium
- Date: 8–9 August
- Competitors: 31 from 25 nations
- Winning points: 8869

Medalists
1st place, gold medalist(s)		Ashton Eaton	United States
2nd place, silver medalist(s)		Trey Hardee	United States
3rd place, bronze medalist(s)		Leonel Suárez	Cuba

Official Video Javelin and 1500 Highlights, Interviews 100 metres Day 1 Highlights High Jump and 400m Highlights 400 metres 110m Hurdles full 1500m

The Men's decathlon competition at the 2012 Summer Olympics in London, United Kingdom, was held at the Olympic Stadium on 8–9 August.

From the outset, new world record holder Ashton Eaton dominated the events with teammate Trey Hardee his closest competitor. Notable for his early exit, 2004 champion and former world record holder Roman Šebrle withdrew after finishing last in the 100 m. Eaton's 10.35 100 metres was the top time of the day, Hardee's 10.42 the next best. His 8.03 long jump was almost half a metre further than any other competitor. Dmitriy Karpov won the shot put, but Eaton's 14.66 was just 12 cm short of his personal record. Leonel Suárez won the high jump, but Eaton tied with several members of the field for second best. And Eaton's 46.90 400 metres was over a full second faster than anybody else in the field. Damian Warner had a 40-point advantage for third position after the first day.

Hardee started day two off with a victory over Eaton in the 110 metres hurdles, but it was only .02, narrowing the gap by 3 points. Rico Freimuth was the top discus thrower, with Hardee 85 cm behind him. Eaton's discus was 5.75 m less, giving Hardee almost an extra 120 point dent into the gap. Eaton more than gained that back with the third best pole vault of the day, while Hardee was 40 cm back. In the javelin throw, Leonel Suárez put more than 10 meters on the rest of the contenders, to solidly place himself in bronze medal position. Hardee was the third best thrower, but his gap was not as large as he needed while Eaton set a new personal best in the event. With Eaton holding a 150+ point lead, Hardee a 70-point lead over Suárez, who held an 80-point lead over a crowd of his nearest challengers, the medals were fairly well set before the gun in the 1500 metres. Hans van Alphen led the way to move into fourth place, but nobody made a serious run at improving their medals, instead choosing to just finish the last event. For Suárez, it was his second Olympic bronze medal in a row.

== Competition format ==
The decathlon consists of ten track and field events, with a points system that awards higher scores for better results in each of the ten components. The athletes all compete in one competition with no elimination rounds.

At the end of competition, if two athletes are tied, the athlete who has received more points in the greater number of events is the winner.

== Schedule ==
All times are British Summer Time (UTC+1)

Date	Time	Round
Wednesday, 8 August 2012	10:10; 11:10; 12:50; 18:00; 21:30	100 metres Long jump Shot put High jump 400 metres
Thursday, 9 August 2012	09:00; 09:55; 12:55; 18:30; 21:20	110 metres hurdles Discus throw Pole vault Javelin throw 1500 metres

== Records ==
Prior to the competition, the existing World and Olympic records were as follows.

World record	Ashton Eaton (USA)	9039	Eugene, United States	23 June 2012
Olympic record	Roman Šebrle (CZE)	8893	Athens, Greece	24 August 2004
2012 World leading	Ashton Eaton (USA)	9039	Eugene, United States	23 June 2012

== Overall results ==
Key

The highest mark recorded in each event is highlighted in yellow. These marks were split between seven competitors with the gold medallist claiming three of them.

Key:	NR	National record	PB	Personal best	SB	Seasonal best	DNS	Did not start	DNF	Did not finish

Rank	Athlete	Overall points	100 m	LJ	SP	HJ	400 m	110 m H	DT	PV	JT	1500 m
1st place, gold medalist(s)	Ashton Eaton (USA)	8869	1011; 10.35 s	1068; 8.03 m	769; 14.66 m	850; 2.05 m	963; 46.90 s	1032; 13.56 s	716; 42.53 m	972; 5.20 m	767; 61.96 m	721; 4:33.59 min
2nd place, silver medalist(s)	Trey Hardee (USA)	8671 (SB)	994; 10.42 s	942; 7.53 m	807; 15.28 m	794; 1.99 m	904; 48.11 s	1035; 13.54 s	834; 48.26 m	849; 4.80 m	838; 66.65 m	674; 4:40.94 min
3rd place, bronze medalist(s)	Leonel Suárez (CUB)	8523 (SB)	801; 11.27 s	940; 7.52 m	759; 14.50 m	906; 2.11 m	859; 49.04 s	917; 14.45 s	782; 45.75 m	819; 4.70 m	996; 76.94 m	744; 4:30.08 min
4	Hans Van Alphen (BEL)	8447	850; 11.05 s	970; 7.64 m	819; 15.48 m	850; 2.05 m	853; 49.18 s	863; 14.89 s	835; 48.28 m	849; 4.80 m	763; 61.69 m	795; 4:22.50 min
5	Damian Warner (CAN)	8442 (PB)	980; 10.48 s	945; 7.54 m	712; 13.73 m	850; 2.05 m	899; 48.20 s	926; 14.38 s	785; 45.90 m	819; 4.70 m	780; 62.77 m	746; 4:29.85 min
6	Rico Freimuth (GER)	8320	940; 10.65 s	864; 7.21 m	782; 14.87 m	714; 1.90 m	906; 48.06 s	989; 13.89 s	852; 49.11 m	880; 4.90 m	698; 57.37 m	695; 4:37.62 min
7	Oleksiy Kasyanov (UKR)	8283	961; 10.56 s	947; 7.55 m	756; 14.45 m	794; 1.99 m	888; 48.44 s	963; 14.09 s	802; 46.72 m	790; 4.60 m	661; 54.87 m	721; 4:33.68 min
8	Sergey Sviridov (RUS)	8219	910; 10.78 s	922; 7.45 m	754; 14.42 m	794; 1.99 m	866; 48.91 s	799; 15.42 s	817; 47.43 m	790; 4.60 m	865; 68.42 m	702; 4:36.63 min
9	Willem Coertzen (RSA)	8173	841; 11.09 s	854; 7.17 m	715; 13.79 m	850; 2.05 m	882; 48.56 s	955; 14.15 s	738; 43.58 m	760; 4.50 m	810; 64.79 m	768; 4:26.52 min
10	Pascal Behrenbruch (GER)	8126	847; 11.06 s	850; 7.15 m	831; 15.67 m	767; 1.96 m	813; 50.04 s	932; 14.33 s	761; 44.71 m	819; 4.70 m	810; 64.80 m	696; 4:37.46 min
11	Eelco Sintnicolaas (NED)	8034	894; 10.85 s	903; 7.37 m	739; 14.18 m	740; 1.93 m	868; 48.85 s	920; 14.43 s	509; 32.26 m	1004; 5.30 m	720; 58.82 m	737; 4:31.17 min
12	Brent Newdick (NZL)	7988	838; 11.10 s	900; 7.36 m	795; 15.09 m	767; 1.96 m	804; 50.22 s	847; 15.02 s	791; 46.15 m	819; 4.70 m	735; 59.82 m	692; 4:38.20 min
13	Gonzalo Barroilhet (CHI)	7972	821; 11.18 s	767; 6.80 m	758; 14.49 m	850; 2.05 m	766; 51.07 s	959; 14.12 s	690; 41.27 m	1035; 5.40 m	697; 57.25 m	629; 4:48.23 min
14	Yordanis García (CUB)	7956	906; 10.80 s	755; 6.75 m	758; 14.48 m	794; 1.99 m	873; 48.76 s	944; 14.24 s	711; 42.27 m	790; 4.60 m	736; 59.85 m	689; 4:38.57 min
15	Kevin Mayer (FRA)	7952	791; 11.32 s	854; 7.17 m	731; 14.05 m	850; 2.05 m	873; 48.76 s	780; 15.59 s	689; 41.20 m	819; 4.70 m	774; 62.41 m	791; 4:23.02 min
16	Ilya Shkurenyov (RUS)	7948	858; 11.01 s	874; 7.25 m	661; 12.89 m	822; 2.02 m	823; 49.81 s	925; 14.39 s	736; 43.51 m	941; 5.10 m	645; 53.81 m	663; 4:42.80 min
17	Eduard Mikhan (BLR)	7928	919; 10.74 s	799; 6.94 m	774; 14.75 m	740; 1.93 m	889; 48.42 s	955; 14.15 s	755; 44.42 m	731; 4.40 m	673; 55.69 m	693; 4:38.06 min
18	Dmitriy Karpov (KAZ)	7926	881; 10.91 s	864; 7.21 m	880; 16.47 m	794; 1.99 m	822; 49.83 s	924; 14.40 s	765; 44.93 m	941; 5.10 m	588; 49.93 m	467; 5:16.83 min
19	Luiz Alberto de Araújo (BRA)	7849	929; 10.70 s	852; 7.16 m	699; 13.52 m	740; 1.93 m	897; 48.25 s	875; 14.79 s	762; 44.76 m	790; 4.60 m	612; 51.59 m	693; 4:38.04 min
20	Keisuke Ushiro (JPN)	7842	791; 11.32 s	781; 6.86 m	703; 13.59 m	794; 1.99 m	779; 50.78 s	794; 15.47 s	801; 46.66 m	880; 4.90 m	834; 66.38 m	685; 4:39.33 min
21	Ingmar Vos (NED)	7805	865; 10.98 s	878; 7.27 m	714; 13.77 m	767; 1.96 m	832; 49.62 s	897; 14.61 s	711; 42.26 m	760; 4.50 m	762; 61.60 m	619; 4:50.01 min
22	Edgars Eriņš (LAT)	7649	863; 10.99 s	809; 6.98 m	695; 13.45 m	740; 1.93 m	786; 50.62 s	823; 15.22 s	769; 45.10 m	760; 4.50 m	698; 57.35 m	706; 4:35.88 min
23	Jangy Addy (LBR)	7586	885; 10.89 s	790; 6.90 m	788; 14.97 m	740; 1.93 m	878; 48.64 s	945; 14.23 s	779; 45.61 m	673; 4.20 m	594; 50.36 m	514; 5:08.14 min
24	Attila Szabó (HUN)	7581	827; 11.15 s	804; 6.96 m	724; 13.93 m	714; 1.90 m	777; 50.83 s	859; 14.92 s	770; 45.14 m	790; 4.60 m	720; 58.84 m	596; 4:53.81 min
25	Darius Draudvila (LTU)	7557	872; 10.95 s	842; 7.12 m	800; 15.17 m	767; 1.96 m	809; 50.13 s	865; 14.87 s	796; 46.43 m	673; 4.20 m	591; 50.16 m	542; 5:03.14 min
26	Rifat Artikov (UZB)	7203	780; 11.37 s	677; 6.41 m	735; 14.11 m	740; 1.93 m	729; 51.91 s	881; 14.74 s	737; 43.53 m	731; 4.40 m	687; 56.62 m	506; 5:09.52 min
—	Jan Felix Knobel (GER)	DNF	769; 11.42 s	826; 7.05 m	808; 15.29 m	850; 2.05 m	821; 49.87 s	846; 15.03 s	790; 46.10 m	731; 4.40 m	DNS	DNS
—	Kurt Felix (GRN)	DNF	834; 11.12 s	967; 7.63 m	684; 13.28 m	850; 2.05 m	807; 50.17 s	DNS	DNS	DNS	DNS	DNS
—	Mihail Dudaš (SRB)	DNF	883; 10.90 s	942; 7.53 m	714; 13.76 m	767; 1.96 m	DNS	DNS	DNS	DNS	DNS	DNS
—	Daniel Awde (GBR)	DNF	926; 10.71 s	774; 6.83 m	DNS	DNS	DNS	DNS	DNS	DNS	DNS	DNS
—	Roman Šebrle (CZE)	DNF	744; 11.54 s	DNS	DNS	DNS	DNS	DNS	DNS	DNS	DNS	DNS
