= Mihail Dudaš =

Serbian decathlete (born 1989)

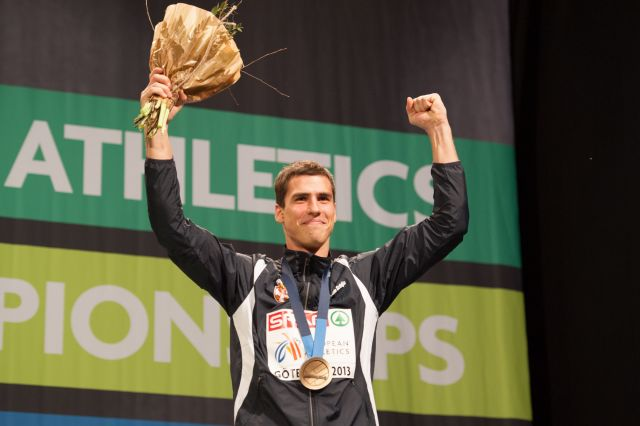
- Dudaš with his bronze medal at the 2013 European Indoor Championships

Personal information
- Native name: Михаил Дудаш
- Nationality: Serbian
- Born: 15 November 1989 (age 36) Novi Sad, SR Serbia, SFR Yugoslavia
- Height: 1.83 m (6 ft 0 in)
- Weight: 84 kg (185 lb)

Sport
- Sport: Track and field
- Event: Combined events
- Club: AK Vojvodina
- Coached by: Feđa Kamasi

Achievements and titles
- Personal bests: Decathlon: 8275 pts (2013, NR); Heptathlon: 6099 pts (2013, NR)
Medal record
Men's athletics
Representing Serbia
European Championships
Bronze medal – third place	2016 Amsterdam	Decathlon
European Indoor Championships
Bronze medal – third place	2013 Gothenburg	Heptathlon
European U23 Championships
Bronze medal – third place	2009 Kaunas	Decathlon
Bronze medal – third place	2011 Ostrava	Decathlon
World Junior Championships
Bronze medal – third place	2008 Bydgoszcz	Decathlon

Mihail Dudaš (Serbian: Михаил Дудаш; born 15 November 1989) is a Serbian former decathlete and heptathlete who holds the national records in both events. He won bronze medals at the 2016 European Championships and the 2013 European Indoor Championships, and competed at the 2012 and 2016 Summer Olympics. After his athletics career, he served as sports director of the Athletics Federation of Serbia until resigning in 2025. A supporter of the anti-corruption protests, he is a candidate of the Student List in the 2026 Serbian parliamentary election.

== Athletics career ==
Dudaš won bronze in the decathlon at the 2008 World Junior Championships, followed by bronze medals at the European Athletics U23 Championships in 2009 and 2011.

His senior breakthrough came at the 2011 World Championships in Daegu, where he finished sixth with a national record of 8,256 points. He placed fourth at the 2012 European Championships and qualified for the 2012 Olympic decathlon, which he did not finish because of a migraine. At the 2013 European Indoor Championships in Gothenburg, he won his first senior medal, a bronze in the heptathlon, setting a national record of 6,099 points. Later that year, he improved his decathlon national record to 8,275 points at the World Championships in Moscow, finishing 14th.

He missed the entire 2014 season after surgery on his Achilles tendon. He returned to win the bronze medal in the decathlon at the 2016 European Championships in Amsterdam. He again qualified for the Olympic decathlon in Rio de Janeiro, but did not finish.

== Sports administration ==
Dudaš later became sports director of the Athletics Federation of Serbia (SAS). He resigned in early 2025, saying that after devoting 28 years to the sport he could no longer support the values the federation represented, and that he would not accept "athletics without transparency, freedom and integrity".

== Political activity ==
Dudaš publicly supported the student-led anti-corruption protests that followed the Novi Sad railway station canopy collapse in his hometown, and took part in protest actions in 2025. In a January 2026 interview, he said the year would be remembered for "the awakening of young people", and that he had felt privileged to take part in the protest actions, including the walk from Belgrade to Novi Sad ahead of the first anniversary of the collapse.

In September 2026, he was named 178th on the Student List for the 2026 Serbian parliamentary election. He carried one of the boxes of supporting signatures when the students submitted the list to the Republic Electoral Commission on 14 September. Announcing his candidacy on social media, he wrote: "A cool head and a fiery heart."

== Personal life ==
Dudaš is of Rusyn descent.

== International competitions ==
Year	Competition	Venue	Position	Event	Notes
Representing Serbia
2008	World Junior Championships	Bydgoszcz, Poland	3rd	Decathlon (junior)	7663 pts
2009	European U23 Championships	Kaunas, Lithuania	3rd	Decathlon	7855 pts
2010	Hypo-Meeting	Götzis, Austria	11th	Decathlon	7966 pts
2010	European Championships	Barcelona, Spain	–	Decathlon	DNF
2010	Continental Cup	Split, Croatia	7th	High jump	1.98 m
2011	European U23 Championships	Ostrava, Czech Republic	3rd	Decathlon	8117 pts
2011	World Championships	Daegu, South Korea	6th	Decathlon	8256 pts (NR)
2012	European Championships	Helsinki, Finland	4th	Decathlon	8154 pts
2012	Olympic Games	London, United Kingdom	–	Decathlon	DNF
2013	European Indoor Championships	Gothenburg, Sweden	3rd	Heptathlon	6099 pts (NR)
2013	World Championships	Moscow, Russia	14th	Decathlon	8275 pts (NR)
2016	European Championships	Amsterdam, Netherlands	3rd	Decathlon	8153 pts
2016	Olympic Games	Rio de Janeiro, Brazil	–	Decathlon	DNF
2017	European Indoor Championships	Belgrade, Serbia	14th	Heptathlon	5239 pts
2017	World Championships	London, United Kingdom	–	Decathlon	DNF

== Personal bests ==
=== Outdoor ===
Event	Performance	Location	Date
Decathlon	8275 pts	Moscow	11 August 2013
100 metres	10.67 (−0.5 m/s)	Moscow	10 August 2013
Long jump	7.63 m (25 ft 1/4 in) (+1.5 m/s)	Götzis	29 May 2010
Shot put	14.80 m (48 ft 6 1/2 in)	Nieuwpoort	30 June 2018
High jump	2.04 m (6 ft 8 1/4 in)	Rio de Janeiro	17 August 2016
400 metres	47.47	Ostrava	14 July 2011
110 metres hurdles	14.52 (−1.9 m/s)	Novi Sad	13 May 2016
Discus throw	47.34 m (155 ft 3 3/4 in)	Potchefstroom	26 January 2016
Pole vault	4.90 m (16 ft 3/4 in)	Daegu	28 August 2011
Javelin throw	59.98 m (196 ft 9 1/4 in)	Helsinki	28 June 2012
1500 metres	4:24.30	Kaunas	17 July 2009

=== Indoor ===
Event	Performance	Location	Date
Heptathlon	6099 pts	Gothenburg	3 March 2013
60 metres	6.90	Budapest	22 January 2011
Long jump	7.55 m (24 ft 9 in)	Gothenburg	2 March 2013
Shot put	15.01 m (49 ft 2 3/4 in)	Novi Sad	18 January 2020
High jump	2.08 m (6 ft 9 3/4 in)	Gothenburg	2 March 2013
60 metres hurdles	8.08	Belgrade	6 March 2016
Pole vault	5.10 m (16 ft 8 3/4 in)	Belgrade	5 March 2017
1000 metres	2:39.04	Gothenburg	3 March 2013

Source: World Athletics profile.

== See also ==
- Serbian records in athletics
