= Rico Freimuth =

German decathlete

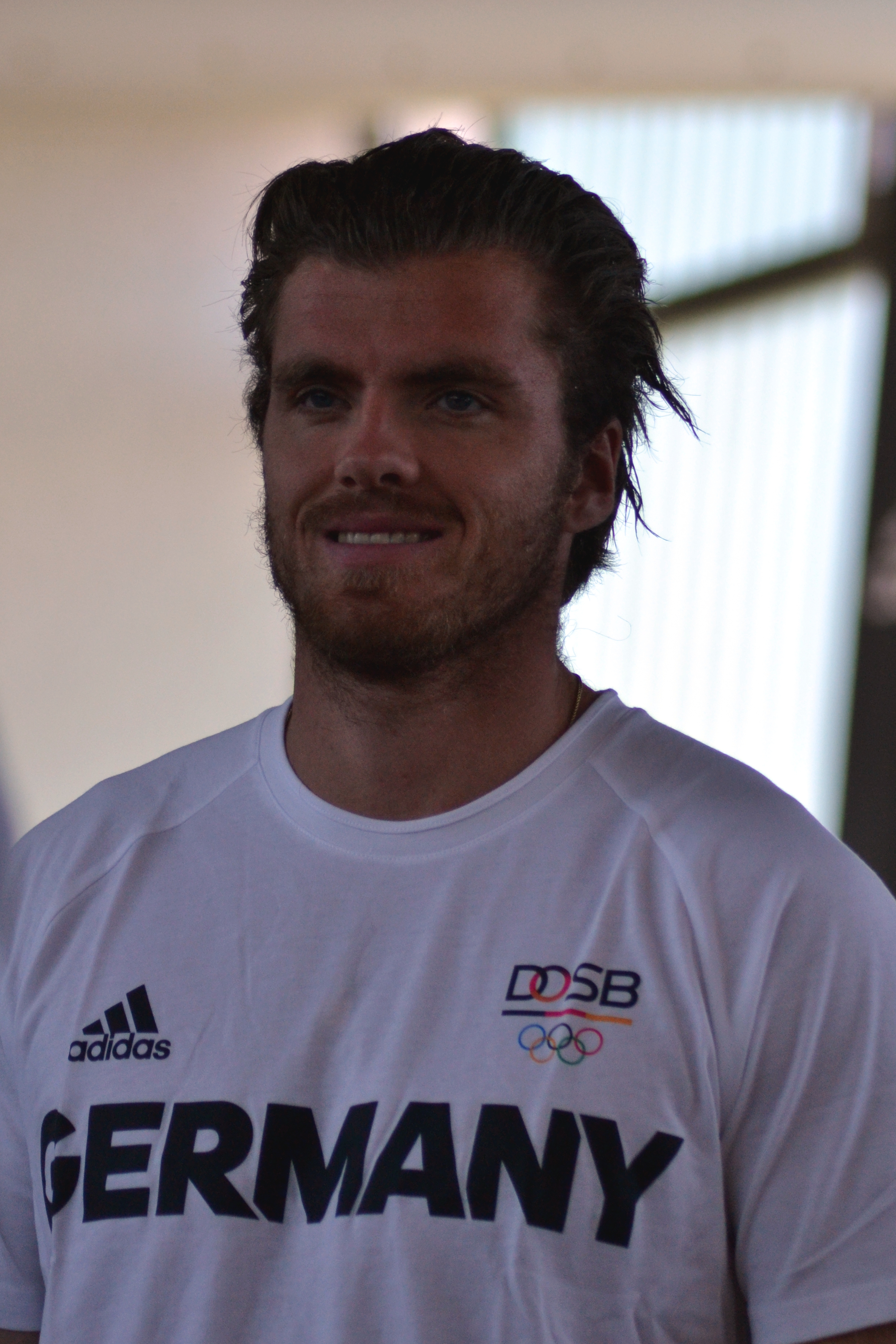
- Freimuth at the 2016 German Olympic Team clothing

Personal information
- Born: 14 March 1988 (age 38) Potsdam, East Germany
- Height: 1.96 m (6 ft 5 in)
- Weight: 94 kg (207 lb)

Sport
- Country: Germany
- Sport: Athletics
- Event: Decathlon

Achievements and titles
- Olympic finals: 6th at the 2012 Summer Olympics
- Personal bests: 100 m: 10.40 (June 2014); Long jump: 7.60 (June 2017); Shot put: 15.62 (June 2015); High jump: 2.01 (June 2017); 400 m: 47.51 (May 2012); 110 m hurdles: 13.63 (August 2014); Discus: 51.56 (June 2017); Pole vault: 4.90 (August 2012, August 2013); Javelin: 65.04 (July 2011); 1500 m: 4:34.69 (June 2013); Decathlon: 8663 (June 2017)
Medal record
Decathlon
World Championships
Silver medal – second place	2017 London	Decathlon
Bronze medal – third place	2015 Beijing	Decathlon
European Junior Championships
Bronze medal – third place	2007 Hengelo

Rico Freimuth (born 14 March 1988) is a retired German athlete who specialised in the decathlon. He won two medals at World Championships, bronze in 2015 and silver in 2017.

Rico is the son of Uwe Freimuth, a decathlete, and the nephew of Jörg Freimuth, a high jumper.

== Achievements ==
Year	Competition	Venue	Position	Event	Notes
Representing Germany
2007	European Junior Championships	Hengelo, Netherlands	3rd	Decathlon	7524 pts, PB
2009	European U23 Championships	Kaunas, Lithuania	10th	Decathlon	7513 pts
2011	World Championships	Daegu, South Korea	—N/a	Decathlon	DNF
2012	Summer Olympics	London, United Kingdom	6th	Decathlon	8320 pts
2015	World Championships	Beijing, China	3rd	Decathlon	8561 pts
2016	Olympic Games	Rio de Janeiro, Brazil	–	Decathlon	DNF
2017	World Championships	London, United Kingdom	2nd	Decathlon	8564 pts
