= 2008 World Junior Championships in Athletics – Men's decathlon =

The men's decathlon event at the 2008 World Junior Championships in Athletics was held in Bydgoszcz, Poland, at Zawisza Stadium on 9 and 10 July. Junior implements were used, i.e. 99.0 cm (3'3) hurdles, 6 kg shot and 1.75 kg discus.

== Medalists ==
Gold	Jan Felix Knobel; Germany
Silver	Eduard Mikhan; Belarus
Bronze	Mihail Dudaš; Serbia

== Results ==
=== Final ===
9/10 July

The highest mark recorded in each event is highlighted in yellow

Rank	Name	Nationality	100m	LJ	SP	HJ	400m	110m H	DT	PV	JT	1500m	Points	Notes
1st place, gold medalist(s)	Jan Felix Knobel	Germany	11.47 (w: -0.3 m/s)	7.12	16.17	1.96	50.52	14.81 (w: -0.1 m/s)	43.96	4.60	66.27	4:47.44	7896	
2nd place, silver medalist(s)	Eduard Mikhan	Belarus	10.82 (w: -0.1 m/s)	7.19	14.67	1.93	48.48	14.54 (w: -0.1 m/s)	44.43	4.40	51.28	4:30.93	7894	
3rd place, bronze medalist(s)	Mihail Dudaš	Serbia	11.03 (w: -0.1 m/s)	7.17	14.50	1.93	48.66	14.83 (w: -0.1 m/s)	43.31	4.30	51.31	4:42.11	7663	
4	Thorsten Margis	Germany	11.19 (w: -0.1 m/s)	6.74	15.69	1.90	50.50	15.30 (w: 0.9 m/s)	45.01	4.20	58.41	4:40.49	7555	
5	Daniil Vasilyev	Russia	11.32 (w: -0.1 m/s)	6.31	16.02	1.90	51.54	15.74 (w: -0.9 m/s)	45.38	4.60	63.45	4:40.35	7552	
6	Adam Bevis	Australia	11.05 (w: -0.1 m/s)	7.22	13.93	1.81	50.04	14.67 (w: -0.1 m/s)	48.34	3.70	53.60	4:44.66	7443	
7	Jacek Nabozny	Poland	11.25 (w: -0.3 m/s)	6.87	13.63	1.99	49.45	15.02 (w: 0.9 m/s)	39.96	3.80	53.14	4:40.52	7314	
8	Mark Tymchenko	Ukraine	11.48 (w: 0.0 m/s)	6.81	14.18	1.84	49.61	15.38 (w: -0.9 m/s)	41.59	4.10	50.44	4:29.14	7250	
9	Anatoli Koshar	Belarus	11.69 (w: 0.0 m/s)	6.41	14.12	1.96	51.25	15.40 (w: -0.9 m/s)	46.96	4.20	53.56	4:42.94	7236	
10	Weston Leutz	United States	11.25 (w: -0.3 m/s)	6.62	12.04	1.81	49.33	14.23 (w: -0.1 m/s)	42.64	4.20	46.83	4:40.37	7178	
11	Chase Dalton	United States	11.37 (w: 0.0 m/s)	6.50	12.31	1.96	51.13	16.83 (w: 0.9 m/s)	48.09	3.90	64.71	4:41.65	7174	
12	Daniel Gardiner	United Kingdom	11.00 (w: 0.0 m/s)	6.80	14.29	1.87	50.09	15.65 (w: -0.9 m/s)	40.95	4.20	45.59	4:53.26	7124	
13	Artur Liiv	Estonia	11.48 (w: 0.0 m/s)	7.03	11.22	1.96	50.62	15.35 (w: -0.9 m/s)	42.74	4.20	51.52	4:57.55	7076	
14	Éric Lankocz	France	11.39 (w: -0.1 m/s)	7.38	13.93	1.96	53.00	16.19 (w: 0.9 m/s)	40.41	4.40	48.15	5:06.01	7056	
15	Denis Tischenko	Russia	11.91 (w: -0.3 m/s)	6.43	13.51	1.93	51.99	15.24 (w: 0.9 m/s)	33.75	4.60	49.70	4:42.87	6910	
16	Szymon Czapiewski	Poland	11.58 (w: -0.3 m/s)	6.44	12.92	1.78	51.87	15.03 (w: -0.1 m/s)	41.80	4.40	46.56	5:05.80	6765	
17	Tomas Kirielius	Lithuania	11.60 (w: -0.3 m/s)	6.36	13.23	1.99	51.67	15.63 (w: -0.1 m/s)	31.85	3.60	60.76	5:01.38	6698	
	Sveinn Elías Elíasson	Iceland	10.79 (w: -0.1 m/s)	6.71	13.28	1.87	48.18	15.41 (w: 0.9 m/s)	32.95	DNS	DNS	DNS	DNF	
	Hendrik Lepik	Estonia	11.81 (w: 0.0 m/s)	6.86	14.40	1.93	53.76	15.96 (w: -0.9 m/s)	39.76	DNF	DNS	DNS	DNF	

== Participation ==
According to an unofficial count, 19 athletes from 13 countries participated in the event.

- Australia (1)
- Belarus (2)
- Estonia (2)
- France (1)
- Germany (2)
- Iceland (1)
- Lithuania (1)
- Poland (2)
- Russia (2)
- Serbia (1)
- Ukraine (1)
- United Kingdom (1)
- United States (2)
