= WBS Training =

WBS Training SE
- Type: Societas Europaea
- Industry: adult and continuing education
- Founded: 1979
- Headquarters: Berlin, Germany
- Key people: Heinrich Kronbichler; Joachim Giese; Martin Heinig; Jana Bernstein
- Revenue: €161.98 million (2024)
- Number of employees: 1,490 (2024)
- Website: www.wbstraining.de

WBS Training SE is a German education provider headquartered in Berlin that is active in adult and continuing education and operates nearly 300 branches across Germany. The company is the parent of the WBS Gruppe, which includes brands such as WBS Training, WBS Training Pro, WBS Schulen, WBS Coding School, WBS Akademie, Northern Business School und DEA Deutsche Eisenbahn Akademie.

Approximately 30,000 participants complete further training or retraining programs at WBS Training SE each year.

== History ==
The company's origins date back to 1979 within the editorial department of Ernst Klett Verlag in Stuttgart; in 1985, the Wirtschafts- und Bildungsservice KG (Klett WBS) was established from this unit. It was acquired by Heinrich Kronbichler and converted into a limited liability company (GmbH). In 1997, the company was fully separated from Klett Verlag, and one year later it became a stock corporation (German Aktiengesellschaft), which to date is not listed on a stock exchange.

In the years that followed, WBS Training opened more branches and broadened its offerings to include courses in areas such as IT, SAP, office administration, management, marketing, press and public relations, and business English.

In 2009, the company operated 38 locations in Germany. One year later, it established WBS Training Schulen gGmbH, which markets vocational training, retraining, and continuing education programs in the fields of health, nursing, and social services under the WBS Schulen brand. Since 2010, WBS Training has been offering continuing education and retraining programs online.

By 2014, the number of participants in online instruction units was at 200 learners across 120 locations in Germany. In addition, the company was certified under the Economy for the Common Good framework. One year later, the company provided free German language courses to refugees and allocated €50,000 for this purpose. When Joachim Giese became a member of the management board in 2016, the company operated more than 170 locations. In that same year, the company supported social and non-profit organizations with donations totaling €200,000.

In 2017, the company introduced its proprietary learning system WBS LearnSpace 3D, which transfers content into a three-dimensional virtual learning space. Within this digital space, participants use avatars to enter classrooms or group work areas, and take part in live instruction there.

In January 2022, the company acquired the start-up Punk Incorporated and implemented gamification offerings.

In April 2026, WBS Training AG was converted into a European Company (Societas Europaea, SE). Since then, the company has operated under the name WBS Training SE.

== Company structure ==
In fiscal year 2024, the company generated annual revenue of €161.98 million and employed 1,490 people.

The members of the management board of WBS Training SE are Austrian entrepreneur Heinrich Kronbichler, German manager Joachim Giese, Martin Heinig and Jana Bernstein.

By the end of 2024, the company operated 278 training centers and 27 advisory offices.

== Services ==
Under the WBS Training brand, the company operates training centers across Germany. These centers provide qualification measures as part of publicly funded vocational continuing education and retraining programs, as well as part-time seminars aimed at imparting labor market–relevant skills. The company offers continuing education and retraining programs for commercial and nursing professions, as well as SAP courses, CAD training, PLC programming, and language courses. In addition, the company provides training for publishing professions and for electronic commerce, as well as for online and trade magazine editors, media designers, PR managers, and human resources administrators. Furthermore, WBS Training offers advanced training programs for qualifications as certified balance sheet accountants and business administrators, and provides training to become a project manager for alternative and renewable energies. The company also operates coaching programs for jobseekers, which can be adjusted from various modules. In addition, it offers advanced professional development and qualification programs for executives in the context of digitalization. Finally, degree programs are offered under the WBS Akademie brand as well as in cooperation with Northern Business School.

The qualifications may be funded, for example, by the Bundesagentur für Arbeit (Federal Employment Agency), a Jobcenter, or the Berufsförderungsdienst (Career Support Service). The course offerings are certified by DQS in accordance with the Akkreditierungs- und Zulassungsverordnung Arbeitsförderung (AZAV), and the company is, among other things, a certified training partner of SAP, Microsoft, DATEV, and Lexware. The Arbeitsagentur für Arbeitsmarkt-Dienstleistungen (AMDL) regularly assesses implementation quality, including participant information, the course process, course design and delivery, staff qualifications, facilities, technical equipment, evaluation, and participant surveys on delivery quality.

In addition to the respective educational measures, WBS Training offers advisory services to support the selection of a continuing education program, during which participants' skills, interests, and experience are assessed.

== Publications ==
The company regularly conducts labor market studies and publishes the results in their JobReport. These reports analyze and assess, for example, professional situations and prospects in the healthcare sector or among SAP specialists. The 2015 edition Professions in the Media (Berufe in den Medien) analyzed, among other aspects, career opportunities in the fields of online media and social media based on approximately nationwide 26,000 job postings between March and May 2015.

== Awards ==
- 2006: Ranked first for the course Englisch für den Beruf among the most popular educational offerings in the Berlin and Brandenburg continuing education database.
- 2016: Top Institut für Berufliche Bildung, awarded by Deutschlandtest.
- 2017: Deutschlands beste Jobs mit Zukunft quality seal, awarded by Focus and Focus Money in cooperation with Werner Sarges of Helmut Schmidt University Hamburg.
- 2022: German Bildungsaward in the category Vocational Continuing Education, awarded by the German Institute for Service Quality and n-tv.
