= RheinMain University of Applied Sciences =

University in Wiesbaden, Germany

Coordinates: 50°04′51″N 8°13′02″E

- Hochschule RheinMain
- Type: Public
- Established: 1971
- President: Eva Waller
- Faculty: 252
- Administrative staff: 648
- Students: 13,920 (Winterterm 2020/21)
- Location: Wiesbaden, Hessen, Germany
- Campus: Wiesbaden, Rüsselsheim
- Website: https://www.hs-rm.de/en/

The RheinMain University of Applied Sciences (German: Hochschule RheinMain), formerly University of Applied Sciences Wiesbaden (German: Fachhochschule Wiesbaden), is a university located in Wiesbaden, Germany, founded in 1971. It is part of the IT-Cluster Rhine-Main-Neckar, the "Silicon Valley of Europe".

== History ==
The University of Applied Sciences Wiesbaden (German: Fachhochschule Wiesbaden) was founded in 1971. On 1 September 2009 it was renamed RheinMain University of Applied Sciences.

The former Geisenheim campus became a separate university in 2013.

== Description ==
RheinMain University of Applied Sciences is part of the IT-Cluster Rhine-Main-Neckar, the "Silicon Valley of Europe".

Study programs are divided into the following faculties:

- Faculty of Applied Social Sciences
- Faculty of Architecture and Civil Engineering
- Faculty of Design – Computer Science – Media
- Faculty of Engineering
- Wiesbaden Business School

The faculties of Social Sciences, Architecture and Civil Engineering, Design – Computer Science - Media, and the Wiesbaden Business School are located in Wiesbaden. The Faculty of Engineering is situated nearby Rüsselsheim.

As of 2019 more than 14,000 students were studying at RheinMain University of Applied Sciences: About 10,600 in Wiesbaden and about 3,500 in Rüsselsheim. They are enrolled in about 70 different degree programs, including part-time and cooperative, distance learning and master's programs.

In 2011 the university had about 900 employees.

== Research and PhD programs ==
RheinMain University of Applied Sciences is internationally recognized for its professionally qualifying education and its application-oriented research. This is particularly evident in the three research focuses on the following topics

- Engineering 4.0
- Smart systems for people and technology
- Professionalism of social work

Since 2017, RheinMain University of Applied Sciences has had the independent right to execute PhD research and award doctorates in the fields of social work and applied computer science, and since 2020, the right to award doctorates in the field of mobility and logistics. Two doctoral colleges are also run jointly with Goethe University Frankfurt am Main.

== Campuses ==
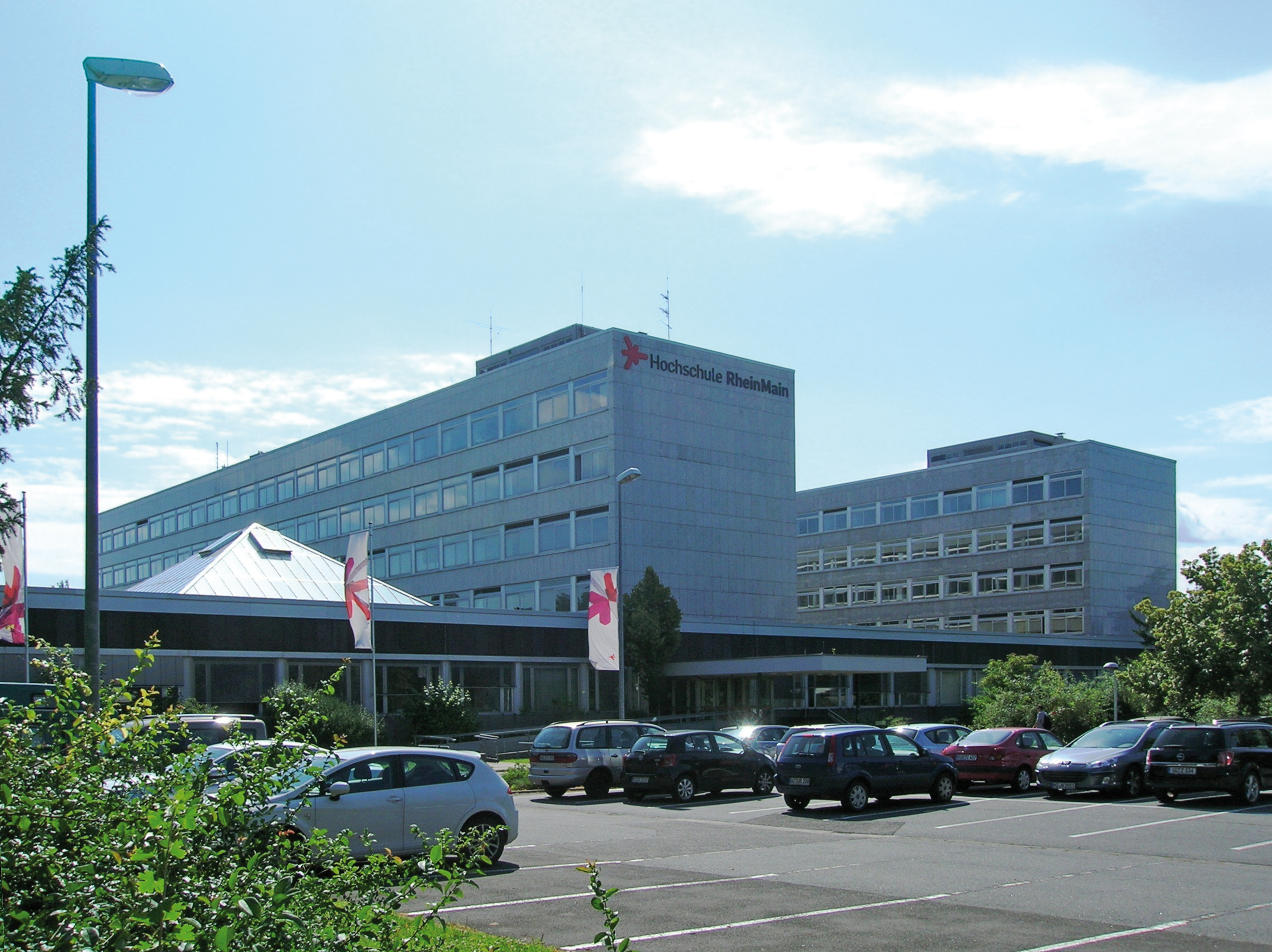
Campus Rüsselsheim main entrance

The campuses of the RheinMain University of Applied Sciences are located in the Rhein Main area, in the west of Germany.

=== Wiesbaden ===
The study location Wiesbaden consists of three campuses.

- Kurt-Schumacher-Ring

At the Kurt-Schumacher-Ring campus the Faculty of Architecture and Civil Engineering and the Faculty of Applied Social Sciences can be found.

- Bleichstraße/Bertramstraße

The Bleichstraße/Bertramstraße campus is an inner city campus in Wiesbaden. The Wiesbaden Business School is situated there as well as a specialized library.

- Unter den Eichen

The Faculty of Design, Computer Science and Media is situated on this campus.

=== Rüsselsheim ===
- Am Brückweg

The Faculty of Engineering is based in Rüsselsheim on the campus Am Brückweg.

== Partner institutions ==
The university has a number of partner universities in many countries, including Australia, China, Korea, Latvia, Mexico and Turkey.

== See also ==
- List of colleges and universities
