= Eduard Mikhan =

Belarusian decathlete

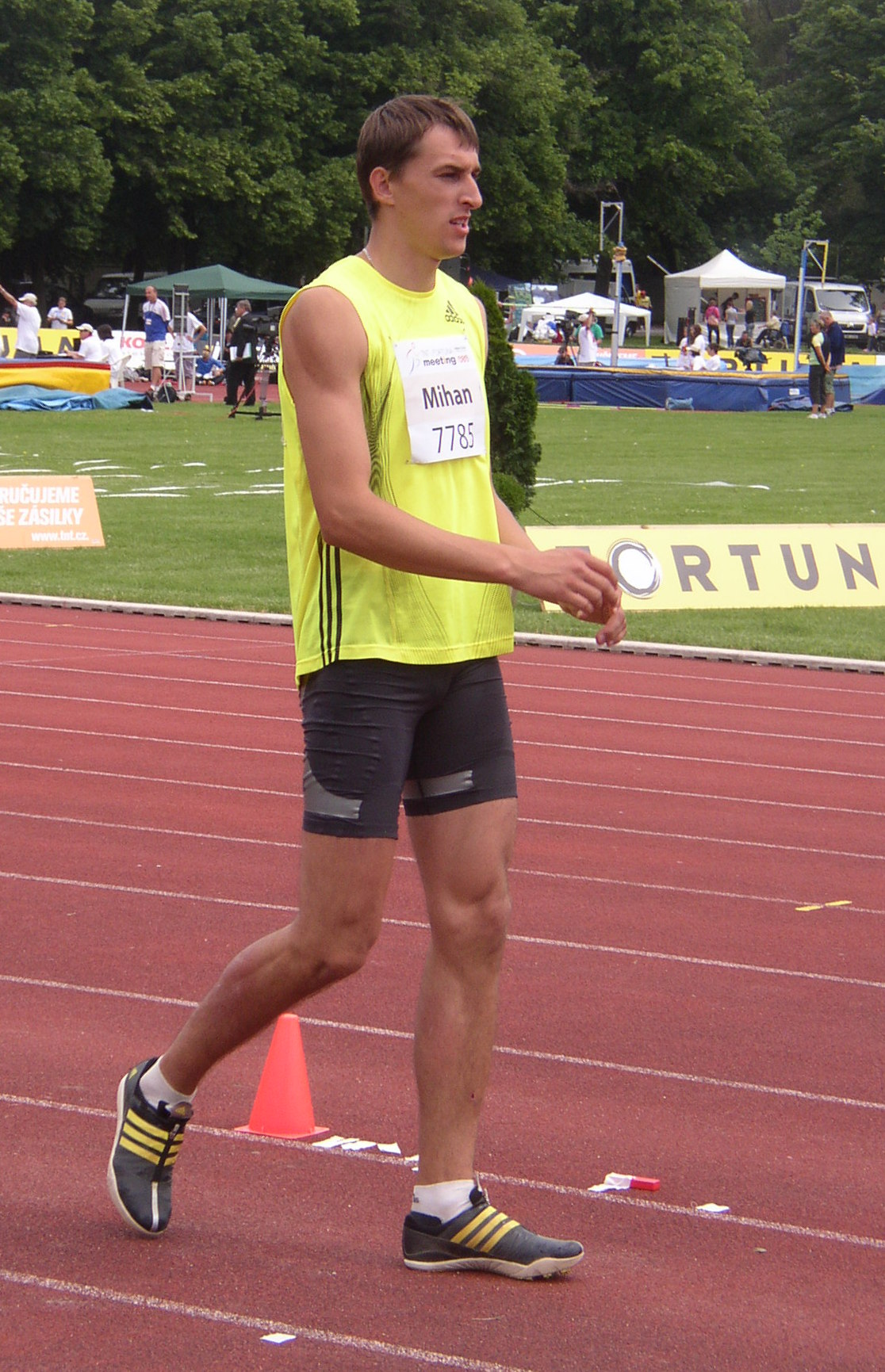
Eduard Mikhan at the 2010 TNT - Fortuna Meeting in Kladno

Eduard Viktaravich Mikhan (Belarusian: Эдуард Віктаравіч Міхан; born June 7, 1989, in Luninets) is a Belarusian decathlete.

== Achievements ==
Year	Competition	Venue	Position	Event	Notes
Representing Belarus
2008	World Junior Championships	Bydgoszcz, Poland	2nd	Decathlon Junior	7894 pts
2009	European U23 Championships	Kaunas, Lithuania	4th	Decathlon	7785 pts
2010	European Championships	Barcelona, Spain	8th	Decathlon	7999
2011	European Indoor Championships	Paris, France	11th	Heptathlon	5844
2011	European U23 Championships	Ostrava, Czech Republic	2nd	Decathlon	8152 pts
2012	Summer Olympics	London, England	17th	Decathlon	7928
