= Roth & Rau =

Roth & Rau AG
- Company type: Aktiengesellschaft
- Traded as: FWB: R8R
- Industry: Solar energy
- Predecessor: Roth & Rau Oberflächentechnik GmbH
- Founded: 22 June 1991
- Headquarters: Hohenstein-Ernstthal, Germany
- Key people: Peter M. Wagner (CEO), Andrea Sieber (Chairman of the supervisory board)
- Products: Anti-reflective coating plants for solar cells; polycrystalline silicon and thin film solar cell production lines; ion beam and plasma sources
- Revenue: €285.4 million (2010)
- Operating income: ▼ (€27.3 million) (2010)
- Net income: ▼ (€25.8 million) (2010)
- Total assets: €433.3 million (end 2010)
- Total equity: €251.4 million (end 2010)
- Number of employees: 1,210 (end 2010)
- Website: www.roth-rau.de

Roth & Rau is a German solar energy company founded in 1991. It manufactures machines and equipment used in solar panel production. Its product portfolio includes PECVD coating plants.
