= T-Systems =

German IT services company

T-Systems International GmbH

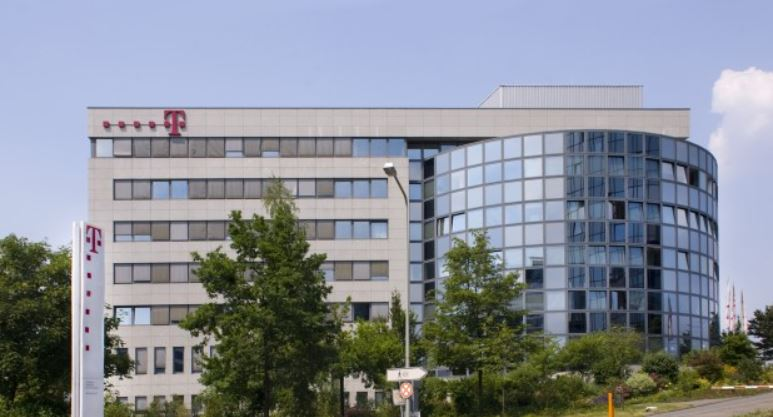
- T-Systems Headquarters in Frankfurt, Hessen
- Type: Subsidiary
- Industry: Information technology Consulting; Outsourcing
- Founded: 2000; 26 years ago
- Headquarters: Frankfurt, Hessen, Germany
- Area served: Worldwide
- Key people: Ferri Abolhassan (CEO), Claudia Nemat, chairman of the supervisory board
- Revenue: EUR 4.2 billion (2020)
- Number of employees: 28,000
- Parent: Deutsche Telekom
- Website: t-systems.com

T-Systems International GmbH, trading as T-Systems, is an internationally operating service provider for information technologies and digital transformation. The company is part of Deutsche Telekom and is headquartered in Frankfurt am Main.

As of 2012, T-Systems was the largest German and one of the largest European IT services companies, serving customers such as WestLB, Old Mutual, Daimler, Volkswagen, Royal Dutch Shell, Sanlam, Murray & Roberts, BP, TUI AG, De Agostini, Philips, MAN SE, Airbus, E.ON. and British American Tobacco. The company operates in more than 20 countries and in 2015 employed 45,990 people, in 2003 were approximately 50,000 people worldwide, among them around 27,000 in Germany and 23,000 outside. Beginning in December 2007 Reinhard Clemens was the CEO. Before that, he had been president of EDS (now HP Enterprise Services) Germany since 2003. Since January 2018 Adel Al-Saleh has been the CEO of T-Systems.

In June 2018, T-Systems announced it will cut 10,000 jobs in 3 years, including 6,000 in Germany, with the hope of returning the company to profitability.

== History ==
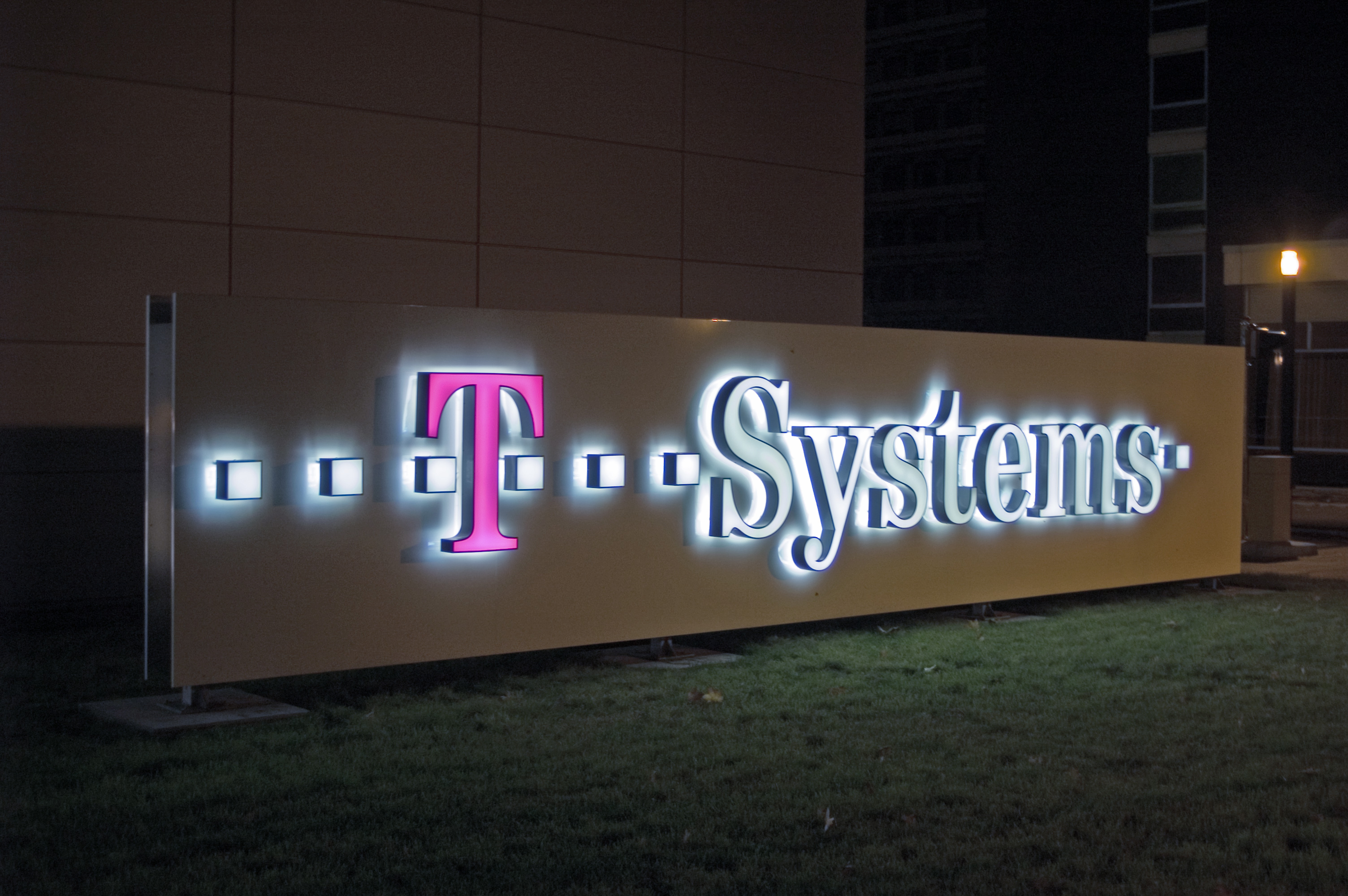
Sign outside T-Systems, Darmstadt, 2005

First T-Systems logo (2002-2010)

Second T-Systems logo (2010-2022)

Third T-Systems logo (2022-2024)

T-Systems was founded in 2000, when Deutsche Telekom acquired a 50.1% stake of debis Systemhaus, one of the largest IT services companies in Germany at the time. Most of Deutsche Telekom's existing service and IT businesses were then merged and incorporated under the control of one single company, the newly founded T-Systems. In 2001 T-System's headquarters were moved from Bonn to Frankfurt. In 2002 the remaining 49.9% share of debis Systemhaus was acquired and fully incorporated into T-Systems.

However, the company underwent a leadership crisis during the first years after its creation, due to different agendas of the former debis management and the leadership of the former Telekom subsidiaries. Since then, T-Systems made a number of acquisitions, most notably the purchase of gedas, the IT subsidiary of Volkswagen Group in December 2005. From 2007 to 2018, Reinhard Clemens was T-Systems' CEO. T-Systems also supported the creation of Silicon Saxony, a major IT cluster in Germany.

In 2008 T-Systems and the Cognizant global IT services provider entered into a global alliance. T-Systems' India operations were taken over by Cognizant following this alliance in late March 2008. T-Systems is also working for the German government and a market leader in Germany.

In 2009, T-Systems came with another wing in India (T-Systems ICT India Pvt. Ltd.) to support its global partners. T-Systems ICT India has its head office in Pune with another 'Point of Production' in Bengaluru established in April 2016 and a 'Cloud and Digital Centre' at Nagpur established in 2022 in partnership with Tech Mahindra. Since January 2022, Anant Padmanabhan is the managing director of T-Systems ICT India.

In 2020, T-Systems employed more than 28,000 people in 20 countries and generated annual sales of EUR 4.2 billion.

== International subsidiaries ==
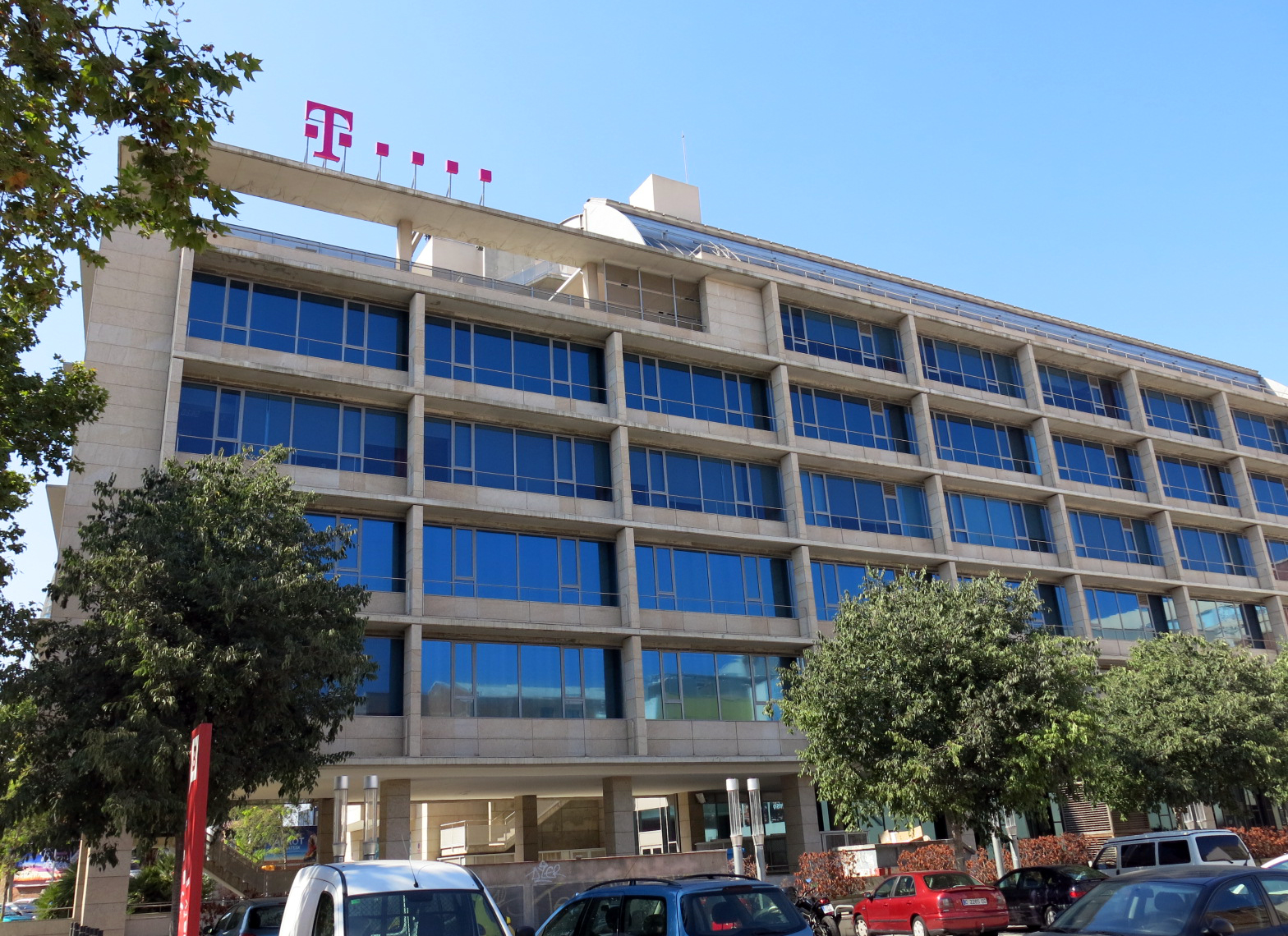
T-Systems building, Barcelona, 2013

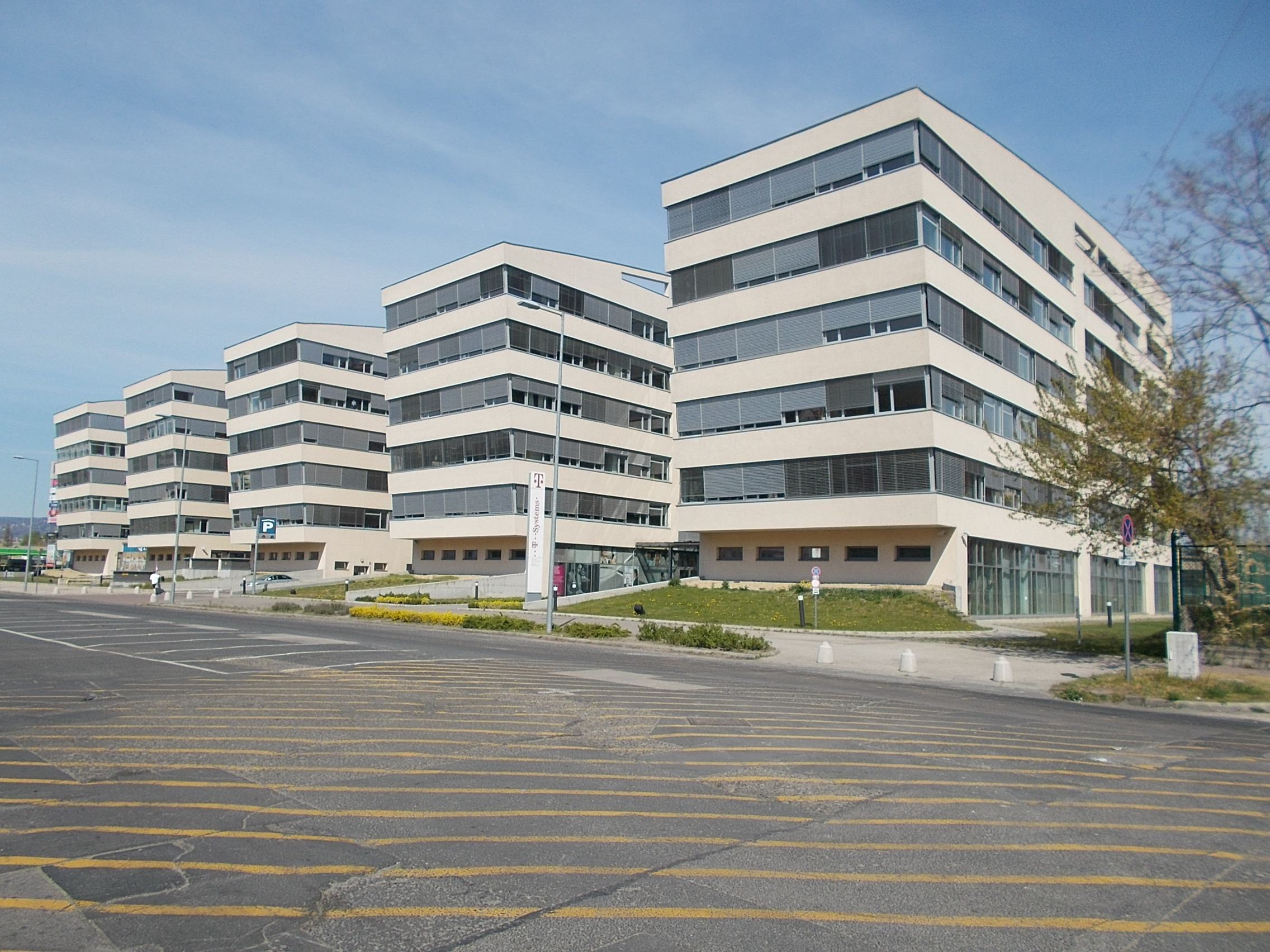
T-Systems building, Budapest, 2015

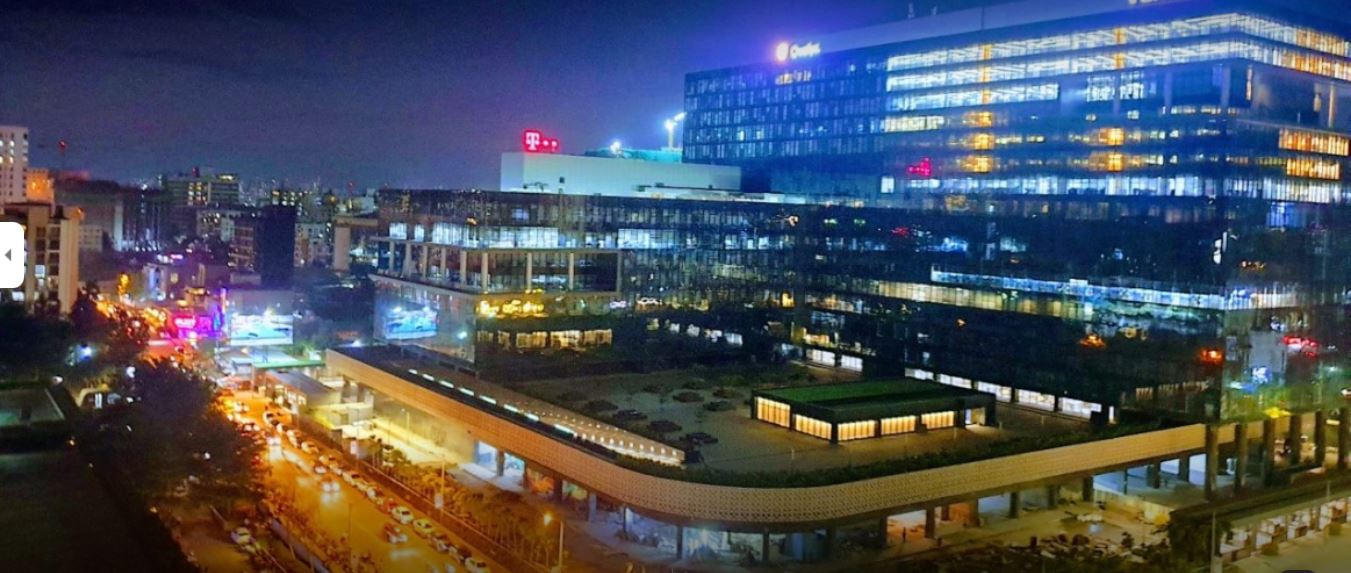
T-Systems India Office

T-Systems has different International Subsidiaries such as:

- T-Systems Austria GmbH (Austria)
- T-Systems Belgium NV (Belgium)
- T-Systems do Brasil Ltda (Brasil)
- T-Systems France SAS (France)
- Deutsche Telekom IT Solutions Hungary (Hungary)
- T-Systems Luxembourg S.A. (Luxembourg)
- T-Systems México S.A. de C.V. (Mexico)
- T-Systems Nederland B.V. (Netherlands)
- T-Systems Nordic TC A/S (Nordics: Denmark, Finland, Norway & Sweden)
- T-Systems North America, Inc (USA and Canada)
- T-Systems Polska Sp.z o.o. (Poland)
- T-Systems ICT Romania S.R.L. (Romania)
- T-Systems Singapore Pte Ltd (Singapore)
- Deutsche Telekom Systems Solutions Slovakia s.r.o. (Slovakia)
- T-Systems ITC Iberia, S.A (Spain and Portugal)
- T-Systems Schweiz AG (Switzerland)
- T-Systems ICT India Pvt. Ltd. (India)
