= 2016 African Championships in Athletics – Men's decathlon =

The men's decathlon event at the 2016 African Championships in Athletics was held on 22 and 23 June in Kings Park Stadium.

== Results ==
The highest mark recorded in each event is highlighted in yellow

Rank	Athlete	Nationality	100m	LJ	SP	HJ	400m	110m H	DT	PV	JT	1500m	Points	Notes
1st place, gold medalist(s)	Fredriech Pretorius	South Africa	11.10	7.26	13.30	1.97	49.89	14.44	38.60	4.70	53.11	4:25.28	7780	
2nd place, silver medalist(s)	Atsu Nyamadi	Ghana	11.31	7.09	13.83	1.97	50.91	15.04	43.26	3.70	63.48	4:36.12	7501	
3rd place, bronze medalist(s)	Ali Kamé	Madagascar	11.60	6.51	13.40	1.88	52.20	15.59	39.10	4.30	55.65	5:00.76	6892	
4	Guillaume Thierry	Mauritius	11.83	6.78	14.17	1.82	54.50	16.15	41.35	4.50	56.69	5:09.42	6812	
5	Ahmed Awad	Egypt	10.96	6.72	12.67	1.91	50.70	16.70	40.70	3.30	54.30	4:56.34	6770	
6	Fabrice Rajah	Mauritius	12.02	6.11	12.26	1.88	54.85	15.43	34.62	4.30	48.55	4:50.75	6417	
7	Gilbert Koech	Kenya	11.40	6.56	12.37	1.76	49.86	15.90	37.53	NM	58.97	4:24.66	6389	
8	Djibril Doucouré	Mali	11.58	5.90	13.97	1.64	53.29	16.94	39.92	NM	44.79	4:54.65	5590	
	Willem Coertzen	South Africa	11.07	7.27	13.76	1.97	49.69	14.53	42.28	4.60	60.57	DNS	DNF	
	Keagan Cooke	Zimbabwe	11.44	6.75	12.55	1.91	49.01	15.33	37.85	NM	56.07	DNS	DNF	
