= African Combined Events Championships =

International athletics competition

The African Combined Events Championships (French: Championnats d'Afrique d'Épreuves Combinées) is an international athletics competition between African athletes in the disciplines of men's decathlon and women's heptathlon. It became part of the IAAF Combined Events Challenge circuit in 2011.

The two-day event was established in 1999, when it was held in the Algerian capital of Algiers. A second edition was scheduled for 2003, to be held in Réduit, Mauritius, but this plan was abandoned. The second edition of the event was held in Tunis two years later and it was held along with the African Race Walking Championships. Réduit has been the regular host for the competition since 2009, with the last three championships having been held at the town's Maryse Justin Stadium. In 2012, an open track and field meeting, organised by former Mauritian sprinter Stéphan Buckland, was held alongside the main combined events meeting.

Ghana's Margaret Simpson and Ali Kamé of Madagascar are both three time champions of their respective events. Kamé's winning score of 7685 points in 2011 is the event record for the decathlon (as well as being a Malagasy record). Simpson set the current heptathlon record of 6184 points in 2012.

The titles contested at this championships are considered separate from the combined events that feature on the programme at the biennial African Championships in Athletics.

== Editions ==
Edition	Year	City	Country	Date	No. of athletes	No. of nations
1st	1999	Algiers	Algeria	26–27 May		
—	2003	Réduit	Mauritius	Not held		
2nd	2005	Tunis	Tunisia	21–22 May		
3rd	2009	Réduit	Mauritius	18–19 April		
4th	2011	Réduit	Mauritius	16–17 April		
5th	2012	Bambous	Mauritius	13–14 April		
6th	2016	Réduit	Mauritius	2–3 April	12 (+5 invited)	7 (+3 invited)

== Medalists ==
Key: Meet record

=== Decathlon ===
Year	Gold		Silver		Bronze	
1999	Rédouane Youcef (ALG)	7375 pts	Christo Blignaut (RSA)	7347 pts	Amine Hafed (ALG)	7042 pts
2005	François Potgieter (RSA)	7168 pts	Anis Riahi (TUN)	7140 pts	Jannie Botha (RSA)	7004 pts
2009	Ali Kamé (MAD)	7363 pts NR	Ahmed Mohamed Saad (EGY)	7049 pts	Guillaume Thierry (MRI)	6968 pts
2011	Ali Kamé (MAD)	7685 pts NR	Guillaume Thierry (MRI)	7444 pts	George Joubert (RSA)	7431 pts
2012	Ali Kamé (MAD)	7409 pts	Guillaume Thierry (MRI)	7356 pts	Jonathan Caetane (MRI) ^{†}	6147 pts
2016	Guillaume Thierry (MRI)	7481 pts	Louis Fabrice Rajah (MRI) ^{††}	7022 pts	Gert Swanepoel (RSA)	6570 pts

- ^{†} = France's Daouda Amboudi competed as a guest athlete and had the third best performance with a score of 6289 points.
- ^{††} = Italy's Michele Calvi competed as a guest athletes and had the second best performance with a score of 7305 points.

=== Heptathlon ===
Year	Gold		Silver		Bronze	
1999	Stéphanie Domaingue (MRI)	4857 pts	Fatima Zahra Dkouk (MAR)	4742 pts	Zahra Lachgar (MAR)	4715 pts
2005	Sarah Bouaoudia (ALG)	5492 pts	Mona Jabir Ahmed (SUD)	4919 pts	Aïda Chaabane (TUN)	4747 pts
2009	Margaret Simpson (GHA)	5677 pts	Selloane Tsoaeli (LES)	5116 pts	Florence Wasike (KEN)	4906 pts
2011	Margaret Simpson (GHA)	6134 pts	Janet Lawless (RSA)	5673 pts	Uhunoma Osazuwa (NGR)	5663 pts
2012	Margaret Simpson (GHA)	6184 pts	Gabriella Kouassi (CIV) ^{†}	5766 pts	Selloane Tsoaeli (LES)	5194 pts
2016	Marthe Koala (BUR)	5772 pts	Bianca Erwee (RSA)^{††}	5378 pts	Nienka Du Toit (RSA)	5378 pts

- ^{†} = Nafissatou Thiam of Belgium competed as a guest athlete and had the second best performance with a score of 5906 points.
- ^{††} = Mari Klaup of Estonia competed as a guest athlete and had the second best performance with a score of 5583 points.
