= 2006 African Championships in Athletics – Men's decathlon =

The men's decathlon event at the 2006 African Championships in Athletics was held at the Stade Germain Comarmond on August 9–10.

== Medalists ==
Gold	Silver	Bronze
Hamdi Dhouibi; Tunisia	Mourad Souissi; Algeria	Terry Wepener; South Africa

== Results ==
=== 100 metres ===
Wind:
Heat 1: -3.4 m/s, Heat 2: -2.3 m/s

Rank	Heat	Name	Nationality	Time	Points	Notes
1	1	Hamdi Dhouibi	Tunisia	11.14	830	
2	2	Sors Joubert	South Africa	11.44	765	
3	2	Mourad Souissi	Algeria	11.48	757	
4	1	Rédouane Youcef	Algeria	11.51	750	
5	1	Ahmed Mohamad Saad	Egypt	11.53	746	
6	1	Terry Wepener	South Africa	11.73	705	
7	2	Guillaume Thierry	Mauritius	11.78	695	
8	1	Maxwell Evenor	Mauritius	11.84	683	
9	2	Idrissa N'Doye	Senegal	12.11	629	
10	2	Ali Kamé	Madagascar	12.11	629	
11	1	Jannie Botha	South Africa	12.31	591	

=== Shot put ===
Rank	Athlete	Nationality	#1	#2	#3	Result	Points	Notes	Total
1	Hamdi Dhouibi	Tunisia	6.87w	6.97w	7.26w	7.26w	876		1706
2	Rédouane Youcef	Algeria	7.20w	7.22w	7.06	7.22w	866		1616
3	Mourad Souissi	Algeria	6.80w	7.05w	x	7.05w	826		1583
4	Maxwell Evenor	Mauritius	6.70	6.52	6.95w	6.95w	802		1485
5	Guillaume Thierry	Mauritius	6.73	x	6.38	6.73	750		1445
6	Sors Joubert	South Africa	6.66w	6.53	x	6.66w	734		1499
7	Ahmed Mohamad Saad	Egypt	6.37	6.61w	6.42w	6.61w	723		1469
8	Jannie Botha	South Africa	6.29	6.34w	6.60w	6.60w	720		1311
9	Terry Wepener	South Africa	6.33	6.40w	6.37	6.40w	675		1380
10	Idrissa N'Doye	Senegal	x	5.97	6.40	6.40	675		1304
11	Ali Kamé	Madagascar	5.08w	4.70w	–	5.08w	398		1027

=== Shot put ===
Rank	Athlete	Nationality	#1	#2	#3	Result	Points	Notes	Total
1	Hamdi Dhouibi	Tunisia	12.35	12.34	13.76	13.76	714		2420
2	Ahmed Mohamad Saad	Egypt	12.22	12.07	13.27	13.27	684		2153
3	Mourad Souissi	Algeria	12.88	x	11.02	12.88	660		2243
4	Guillaume Thierry	Mauritius	x	12.87	x	12.87	659		2104
5	Terry Wepener	South Africa	11.37	12.58	12.55	12.58	642		2022
6	Jannie Botha	South Africa	12.28	11.91	11.63	12.28	623		1934
7	Maxwell Evenor	Mauritius	11.66	12.04	11.69	12.04	609		2094
8	Rédouane Youcef	Algeria	11.22	x	x	11.22	559		2175
9	Idrissa N'Doye	Senegal	11.13	11.05	10.96	11.13	554		1858
10	Sors Joubert	South Africa	10.94	x	10.26	10.94	542		2041
11	Ali Kamé	Madagascar	10.00	10.25	9.66	10.25	501		1528

=== High jump ===
Rank	Athlete	Nationality	1.55	1.58	1.61	1.64	1.70	1.73	1.76	1.79	1.82	1.85	1.88	1.91	1.94	1.97	2.00	2.03	2.06	2.12	Result	Points	Notes	Total
1	Terry Wepener	South Africa	–	–	–	–	–	–	–	–	–	–	o	–	o	–	o	xxo	xxo	xxx	2.06	859		2881
2	Hamdi Dhouibi	Tunisia	–	–	–	–	–	–	–	–	o	–	o	o	o	xxo					1.97	776		3196
3	Jannie Botha	South Africa	–	–	–	–	–	–	–	–	o	–	xo	–	xo	xxo	xxx				1.97	776		2710
4	Idrissa N'Doye	Senegal	–	–	–	–	–	–	–	xo	–	o	–	xxo	o	xxo	xxx				1.97	776		2634
5	Sors Joubert	South Africa	–	–	–	–	–	–	–	–	–	o	–	xo	xo	xxx					1.94	749		2790
6	Mourad Souissi	Algeria	–	–	–	–	–	–	o	–	o	xo	xo	xo	xo	xxx					1.94	749		2992
7	Ahmed Mohamad Saad	Egypt	–	–	–	–	o	–	o	–	xo	o	xxx								1.85	670		2823
8	Rédouane Youcef	Algeria	–	–	–	–	–	–	o	–	xxo	xxx									1.82	644		2819
9	Guillaume Thierry	Mauritius	–	–	–	o	o	xxo	o	xxx											1.76	593		2697
10	Maxwell Evenor	Mauritius	–	–	–	o	xo	xxo	o	xxx											1.76	593		2687
11	Ali Kamé	Madagascar	xo	o	o	xxo															1.64	496		2024

=== 400 metres ===
Rank	Heat	Name	Nationality	Time	Points	Notes	Total
1	1	Hamdi Dhouibi	Tunisia	48.78	872		4068
2	1	Sors Joubert	South Africa	49.85	822		3612
3	1	Rédouane Youcef	Algeria	49.89	822		3641
4	2	Mourad Souissi	Algeria	49.91	819		3811
5	1	Ahmed Mohamad Saad	Egypt	50.46	794		3617
6	2	Terry Wepener	South Africa	51.11	764		3645
7	1	Guillaume Thierry	Mauritius	52.94	684		3381
8	2	Jannie Botha	South Africa	53.73	651		3361
9	2	Maxwell Evenor	Mauritius	53.99	640		3327
10	2	Ali Kamé	Madagascar	55.40	583		2607
11	1	Idrissa N'Doye	Senegal	56.63	535		3169

=== 110 metres hurdles ===
Wind:
Heat 1: -1.9 m/s, Heat 2: -2.0 m/s

Rank	Heat	Name	Nationality	Time	Points	Notes	Total
1	2	Sors Joubert	South Africa	14.76	879		4491
2	1	Hamdi Dhouibi	Tunisia	14.81	873		4941
3	1	Terry Wepener	South Africa	14.95	856		4501
4	2	Mourad Souissi	Algeria	15.08	840		4651
5	2	Ahmed Mohamad Saad	Egypt	15.33	810		4427
6	2	Idrissa N'Doye	Senegal	15.33	810		3979
7	1	Rédouane Youcef	Algeria	15.98	735		4376
7	2	Guillaume Thierry	Mauritius	15.98	735		4116
9	1	Maxwell Evenor	Mauritius	16.08	724		4051
10	1	Jannie Botha	South Africa	16.46	682		4043
	1	Ali Kamé	Madagascar	DNS	0		DNF

=== Discus throw ===
Rank	Athlete	Nationality	#1	#2	#3	Result	Points	Notes	Total
1	Ahmed Mohamad Saad	Egypt	40.37	38.94	39.20	40.37	672		5099
2	Rédouane Youcef	Algeria	33.53	39.70	38.09	39.70	658		5034
3	Hamdi Dhouibi	Tunisia	28.76	35.04	38.19	38.19	628		5569
4	Jannie Botha	South Africa	x	38.06	37.17	38.06	625		4668
5	Guillaume Thierry	Mauritius	x	37.63	x	37.63	617		4733
6	Terry Wepener	South Africa	30.93	37.23	37.38	37.38	612		5113
7	Maxwell Evenor	Mauritius	x	36.71	34.48	36.71	598		4649
8	Mourad Souissi	Algeria	34.57	32.62	x	34.57	555		5206
	Sors Joubert	South Africa	x	x	x	NM	0		4491
	Idrissa N'Doye	Senegal				DNS	0		DNF

=== Pole vault ===
Rank	Athlete	Nationality	3.00	3.40	3.50	3.60	3.70	3.80	3.90	4.00	4.10	4.20	4.40	4.60	4.80	Result	Points	Notes	Total
1	Hamdi Dhouibi	Tunisia	–	–	–	–	–	–	–	–	–	–	–	xo	xxx	4.60	790		6359
2	Guillaume Thierry	Mauritius	–	–	–	o	–	o	–	o	–	o	xxx			4.20	673		5406
3	Terry Wepener	South Africa	–	–	–	–	xxo	–	xxo	o	xxx					4.00	617		5730
4	Rédouane Youcef	Algeria	–	–	–	–	–	–	xo	xo	–	xxx				4.00	617		5651
5	Ahmed Mohamad Saad	Egypt	o	o	–	o	–	xo	o	xxx						3.90	590		5689
6	Mourad Souissi	Algeria	–	–	o	–	o	–	xxx							3.70	535		5741
	Sors Joubert	South Africa	–	–	–	–	–	xxx								NM	0		4491
	Jannie Botha	South Africa	–	–	–	xxx										NM	0		4668
	Maxwell Evenor	Mauritius	–	–	–	x										NM	0		4649

=== Javelin throw ===
Rank	Athlete	Nationality	#1	#2	#3	Result	Points	Notes	Overall
1	Jannie Botha	South Africa	57.79	x	59.99	59.99	738		5406
2	Terry Wepener	South Africa	55.52	54.57	52.39	55.52	671		6401
3	Mourad Souissi	Algeria	x	54.00	54.91	54.91	662		6403
4	Guillaume Thierry	Mauritius	x	45.60	54.75	54.75	659		6065
5	Hamdi Dhouibi	Tunisia	50.93	48.97	48.82	50.93	602		6961
6	Ahmed Mohamad Saad	Egypt	47.75	48.53	48.65	48.65	569		6258
7	Rédouane Youcef	Algeria	46.95	x	43.95	46.95	544		6195
8	Sors Joubert	South Africa	43.68	43.52	39.97	43.68	496		4987
	Maxwell Evenor	Mauritius				DNS	0		DNF

=== 1500 metres ===
Rank	Name	Nationality	Time	Points	Notes
1	Mourad Souissi	Algeria	4:35.40	710	
2	Ahmed Mohamad Saad	Egypt	4:36.24	704	
3	Terry Wepener	South Africa	4:39.51	683	
4	Rédouane Youcef	Algeria	4:42.98	662	
5	Hamdi Dhouibi	Tunisia	4:52.35	605	
6	Guillaume Thierry	Mauritius	5:04.00	537	
7	Jannie Botha	South Africa	5:05.81	527	
	Sors Joubert	South Africa	DNS	0	

=== Final standings ===
The highest mark recorded in each event is highlighted in yellow

Rank	Athlete	Nationality	100m	LJ	SP	HJ	400m	110m H	DT	PV	JT	1500m	Points	Notes
1st place, gold medalist(s)	Hamdi Dhouibi	Tunisia	11.14	7.26w	13.76	1.97	48.78	14.81	38.19	4.60	50.93	4:52.35	7566	
2nd place, silver medalist(s)	Mourad Souissi	Algeria	11.48	7.05w	12.88	1.94	49.91	15.08	34.57	3.70	54.91	4:35.40	7113	
3rd place, bronze medalist(s)	Terry Wepener	South Africa	11.73	6.40w	12.58	2.06	51.11	14.95	37.38	4.00	55.52	4:39.51	7084	
4	Ahmed Mohamad Saad	Egypt	11.53	6.61w	13.27	1.85	50.46	15.33	40.37	3.90	48.65	4:36.24	6962	
5	Rédouane Youcef	Algeria	11.51	7.22w	11.22	1.82	49.89	15.98	39.70	4.00	46.95	4:42.98	6855	
6	Guillaume Thierry	Mauritius	11.78	6.73	12.87	1.76	52.94	15.98	37.63	4.20	54.75	5:04.00	6602	
7	Jannie Botha	South Africa	12.31	6.60w	12.28	1.97	53.73	16.46	38.06	NM	59.99	5:05.81	5933	
	Sors Joubert	South Africa	11.44	6.66w	10.94	1.94	49.85	14.76	NM	NM	43.68	DNS	DNF	
	Maxwell Evenor	Mauritius	11.84	6.95w	12.04	1.76	53.99	16.08	36.71	NM	DNS	–	DNF	
	Idrissa N'Doye	Senegal	12.11	6.40	11.13	1.97	56.63	15.33	DNS	–	–	–	DNF	
	Ali Kamé	Madagascar	12.11	5.08w	10.25	1.64	55.40	DNS	–	–	–	–	DNF	
