= 2004 African Championships in Athletics – Men's decathlon =

The men's decathlon event at the 2004 African Championships in Athletics was held in Brazzaville, Republic of the Congo on July 16–17.

== Results ==
The highest mark recorded in each event is highlighted in yellow

Rank	Athlete	Nationality	100m	LJ	SP	HJ	400m	110m H	DT	PV	JT	1500m	Points	Notes
1st place, gold medalist(s)	Anis Riahi	Tunisia	11.30	6.96	11.33	1.84	48.38	15.22	39.46	4.40	51.46	4:42.50	7200	
2nd place, silver medalist(s)	Selwin Lieutier	Mauritius	11.24	6.82	12.47	1.78	50.83	14.57	33.85	4.00	54.86	4:59.96	6882	
3rd place, bronze medalist(s)	Célestin Kengué	Congo	11.15	7.34	11.02	1.93	50.16	16.72	28.49	3.80	36.95	4:51.54	6475	NR
4	Boualem Lamri	Algeria	11.65	6.94	10.57	1.96	50.43	14.92	31.76	NM	47.85	4:35.41	6226	
5	Roland Itoua	Congo	11.68	6.08	12.18	1.72	54.19	19.75	33.82	NM	58.75	5:10.93	5254	
	Rédouane Youcef	Algeria	11.16	7.06	11.17	1.84	51.09	DNF	DNS	–	–	–	DNF	
