= 2012 African Championships in Athletics – Men's decathlon =

The men's decathlon at the 2012 African Championships in Athletics was held at the Stade Charles de Gaulle on 27 and 28 June.

== Medalists ==
Gold	Ali Kamé; Madagascar
Silver	Mourad Souissi; Algeria
Bronze	Guillaume Thierry; Mauritius

== Records ==
Standing records prior to the 2012 African Championships in Athletics
World record	Ashton Eaton (USA)	9039	Eugene, United States	23 June 2012
African record	Larbi Bouraada (ALG)	8332	Ratingen, Germany	15 June 2012
Championship record	Larbi Bouraada (ALG)	8148	Nairobi, Kenya	29 July 2010

== Schedule ==
Date	Time	Round
27 June 2012	12:15	100 metres
27 June 2012	13:00	Long jump
27 June 2012	14:00	Shot put
27 June 2012	15:15	High jump
27 June 2012	17:25	400 metres
28 June 2012	11:00	110 metres hurdles
28 June 2012	11:45	Discus throw
28 June 2012	13:00	Pole vault
28 June 2012	15:00	Javelin throw
28 June 2012	16:50	1500 metres
28 June 2012		Final standings

== Results ==
=== 100 metres ===
Rank	Heat	Lane	Name	Nationality	Time	Notes	Points
1	1	6	Nardus Greyling	South Africa	11.03		854
2	2	2	Zavion Kotze	South Africa	11.18		821
3	2	3	Ali Kamé	Madagascar	11.33		789
4	1	4	Mourad Souissi	Algeria	11.59		734
5	1	5	Ahmad Saad	Egypt	11.59		734
6	1	2	Guillaume Thierry	Mauritius	11.74		703
7	2	6	Atsu Nyamadi	Ghana	11.91		669
	1	3	Hugue Djeokeng	Cameroon	DNS		
	2	4	Jangy Addy	Liberia	DNS		
	2	5	Ahmed Hamed	Egypt	DNS		

=== Long jump ===
Rank	Name	Nationality	#1	#2	#3	Result	Notes	Points
1	Ali Kamé	Madagascar	7.16	7.09	7.32	7.32		891
2	Guillaume Thierry	Mauritius	6.97	6.80	6.78	6.97		807
3	Mourad Souissi	Algeria	6.97	x	6.75	6.97		807
4	Zavion Kotze	South Africa	6.57	6.94	6.84	6.94		799
5	Nardus Greyling	South Africa	x	6.75	6.93	6.93		797
6	Ahmad Saad	Egypt	6.53	6.90	6.80	6.90		790
7	Atsu Nyamadi	Ghana	6.55	x	6.73	6.73		750

=== Shot put ===
Rank	Name	Nationality	#1	#2	#3	Result	Notes	Points
1	Mourad Souissi	Algeria	13.57	14.04	14.33	14.33		749
2	Guillaume Thierry	Mauritius	14.00	13.47	14.32	14.32		748
3	Ahmad Saad	Egypt	x	13.06	12.11	13.06		671
4	Ali Kamé	Madagascar	13.04	12.94	12.77	13.04		670
5	Nardus Greyling	South Africa	12.01	11.79	11.77	12.01		607
6	Atsu Nyamadi	Ghana	11.02	11.41	11.33	11.41		571
7	Zavion Kotze	South Africa	10.76	10.63	11.00	11.00		546

=== High jump ===
Rank	Name	Nationality	1.70	1.73	1.76	1.79	1.82	1.85	1.88	1.91	1.94	1.97	2.00	2.03	2.06	2.09	2.12	2.15	Result	Notes	Points
1	Zavion Kotze	South Africa	–	–	–	–	–	–	–	–	–	–	xxo	o	o	xo	o	xxx	2.12		915
2	Ali Kamé	Madagascar	–	–	–	–	xo	xo	xo	o	xxx								1.91		723
3	Ahmad Saad	Egypt	–	–	–	–	–	o	o	xo	xxx								1.91		723
4	Atsu Nyamadi	Ghana	o	o	xo	o	xo	o	xxo	xxx									1.88		696
5	Mourad Souissi	Algeria	o	–	o	–	o	xo	xxx										1.85		696
6	Guillaume Thierry	Mauritius	–	o	o	o	xxx												1.79		619
7	Nardus Greyling	South Africa	xxo	xxo	o	xxx													1.76		593

=== 400 metres ===
Rank	Lane	Name	Nationality	Time	Notes	Points
1	5	Zavion Kotze	South Africa	49.32		846
2	6	Nardus Greyling	South Africa	50.16		807
3	1	Mourad Souissi	Algeria	51.03		768
4	3	Ali Kamé	Madagascar	51.32		755
5	4	Guillaume Thierry	Mauritius	52.32		711
6	2	Atsu Nyamadi	Ghana	55.20		591
7	7	Ahmad Saad	Egypt	58.07		481

=== 110 metres hurdles ===
Rank	Lane	Name	Nationality	Time	Notes	Points
1	4	Ali Kamé	Madagascar	15.32		811
2	5	Zavion Kotze	South Africa	15.42		799
3	3	Mourad Souissi	Algeria	15.44		797
4	6	Nardus Greyling	South Africa	15.62		776
5	7	Guillaume Thierry	Mauritius	15.63		775
6	2	Atsu Nyamadi	Ghana	18.35		491
	1	Ahmad Saad	Egypt	DNF		

=== Discus throw ===
Rank	Name	Nationality	#1	#2	#3	Result	Notes	Points
1	Guillaume Thierry	Mauritius	40.79	34.44	31.95	40.79		681
2	Mourad Souissi	Algeria	37.15	35.20	38.35	38.35		631
3	Ali Kamé	Madagascar	33.42	35.61	34.51	35.61		576
4	Atsu Nyamadi	Ghana	34.29	x	33.06	34.29		549
5	Zavion Kotze	South Africa	34.02	x	31.15	34.02		544
6	Nardus Greyling	South Africa	31.48	24.15	25.22	31.48		494
	Ahmad Saad	Egypt				DNS		

=== Pole vault ===
Rank	Name	Nationality	Result	Notes	Points
1	Ali Kamé	Madagascar	4.30		702
2	Guillaume Thierry	Mauritius	4.30		702
3	Mourad Souissi	Algeria	4.00		617
4	Atsu Nyamadi	Ghana	2.50		242
	Zavion Kotze	South Africa	NM		

=== Javelin throw ===
Rank	Name	Nationality	#1	#2	#3	Result	Notes	Points
1	Ali Kamé	Madagascar	60.07	x	56.76	60.07		739
2	Atsu Nyamadi	Ghana	50.09	52.47	55.55	55.55		671
3	Guillaume Thierry	Mauritius	51.07	x	52.58	52.58		627
4	Mourad Souissi	Algeria	x	46.67	45.86	46.67		539
5	Zavion Kotze	South Africa	36.78	36.58	43.06	43.06		487

=== 1500 metres ===
Rank	Name	Nationality	Result	Notes	Points
1	Zavion Kotze	South Africa	4:36.51		702
2	Atsu Nyamadi	Ghana	4:36.52		702
3	Mourad Souissi	Algeria	4:38.76		688
4	Ali Kamé	Madagascar	4:53.84		596
5	Guillaume Thierry	Mauritius	4:56.22		582

=== Final standings ===
Rank	Name	Nationality	Points	Notes
1st place, gold medalist(s)	Ali Kamé	Madagascar	7252	
2nd place, silver medalist(s)	Mourad Souissi	Algeria	7000	
3rd place, bronze medalist(s)	Guillaume Thierry	Mauritius	6955	
4	Zavion Kotze	South Africa	6459	
5	Atsu Nyamadi	Ghana	5932	
	Ahmed Hamed	Egypt	DNS	
	Jangy Addy	Liberia	DNS	
	Hugue Djeokeng	Cameroon	DNS	
	Nardus Greyling	South Africa	DNF	
	Ahmad Saad	Egypt	DNF	
