= Athletics at the 2007 All-Africa Games – Men's pole vault =

The men's pole vault at the 2007 All-Africa Games was held on July 21.

== Results ==
Rank	Athlete	Nationality	Result	Notes
1st place, gold medalist(s)	Abderrahmane Tamedda	Tunisia	5.10	
2nd place, silver medalist(s)	Karim Sène	Senegal	5.10	
3rd place, bronze medalist(s)	Hamdi Dhouibi	Tunisia	4.90	
4	Syphax Khiari	Algeria	4.80	
5	Jan Blignaut	South Africa	4.80	
6	Guillaume Thierry	Mauritius	4.60	
