= 2010 African Championships in Athletics – Men's pole vault =

The men's pole vault at the 2010 African Championships in Athletics was held on July 31.

== Results ==
| Rank | Athlete | Nationality | 3.60 | 3.80 | 4.00 | 4.20 | 4.30 | 4.40 | 4.50 | 4.60 | 4.70 | 4.80 | Result | Notes |
|---|---|---|---|---|---|---|---|---|---|---|---|---|---|---|
| 1st place, gold medalist(s) | Hamdi Dhouibi | Tunisia | – | – | – | – | – | o | – | xo | o | xxx | 4.70 | SB |
| 2nd place, silver medalist(s) | Larbi Bouraada | Algeria | – | – | – | – | – | o | – | o | xxx | | 4.60 | |
| 3rd place, bronze medalist(s) | Mourad Souissi | Algeria | – | – | – | xo | – | o | – | – | xxx | | 4.40 | |
| 4 | Weldon Kipngetich | Kenya | xxo | xxo | o | xxo | xxx | | | | | | 4.20 | SB |
| 5 | Kennedy Magut | Kenya | o | xo | xo | xxx | | | | | | | 4.00 | SB |
| 6 | Eric Kipngeno | Kenya | xo | xxx | | | | | | | | | 3.60 | |
| 7 | Seatu Tilahun | Ethiopia | xxo | xxx | | | | | | | | | 3.60 | |
| | Guillaume Thierry | Mauritius | | | | | | | | | | | NM | |
