= Athletics at the 2003 All-Africa Games – Men's decathlon =

The men's decathlon event at the 2003 All-Africa Games was held on October 11–12.

== Results ==
The highest mark recorded in each event is highlighted in yellow

Rank	Athlete	Nationality	100m	LJ	SP	HJ	400m	110m H	DT	PV	JT	1500m	Points	Notes
1st place, gold medalist(s)	Mustapha Taha Husein	Egypt	10.95	7.11	13.94	1.91	50.60	15.32	42.44	4.40	50.75	4:53.65	7400	
2nd place, silver medalist(s)	Lee Okoroafo	Nigeria	10.94	7.29	11.83	2.03	51.07	14.68	37.45	3.60	54.87	4:50.19	7240	
3rd place, bronze medalist(s)	Rédouane Youcef	Algeria	10.91	7.24	11.40	1.88	50.68	15.49	38.74	4.00	52.12	4:44.83	7119	
4	Jannie Botha	South Africa	11.75	6.58	11.97	2.03	53.84	16.03	37.04	4.00	62.20	5:05.63	6749	
5	Teddy Sondota	Uganda	11.74	6.48	12.50	1.85	53.52	15.09	39.72	4.00	51.82	5:33.56	6476	
	Selwyn Lieutier	Mauritius	11.16	6.79	DNS	–	–	–	–	–	–	–	DNF	
