= 2014 African Championships in Athletics – Men's decathlon =

The men's decathlon event at the 2014 African Championships in Athletics was held on August 10–11 on Stade de Marrakech.

Bouraada's winning margin was 999 points.

== Medalists ==
Gold	Silver	Bronze
Larbi Bouraada; Algeria	Guillaume Thierry; Mauritius	Atsu Nyamadi; Ghana

== Results ==
=== 100 metres ===
Wind:
Heat 1: +1.0 m/s, Heat 2: +1.0 m/s

Rank	Heat	Name	Nationality	Time	Points	Notes
1	1	Larbi Bouraada	Algeria	10.90	883	
2	2	Willem Coertzen	South Africa	10.99	863	
3	2	Ahmed Saber Ahmed	Egypt	11.28	799	
4	1	Atsu Nyamadi	Ghana	11.29	797	
5	1	Walid Nsiri	Tunisia	11.43	767	
6	2	Guillaume Thierry	Mauritius	11.52	748	
7	2	Florent Lomba Bilisi	Democratic Republic of the Congo	11.53	746	
8	1	Ali Kamé	Madagascar	11.60	732	
9	2	Louis Fabrice Rajah	Mauritius	11.76	699	

=== Long jump ===
Rank	Athlete	Nationality	#1	#2	#3	Result	Points	Notes	Total
1	Larbi Bouraada	Algeria	7.45	7.38w	7.15	7.45	922		1805
2	Atsu Nyamadi	Ghana	x	7.31	7.32w	7.32w	891		1688
3	Willem Coertzen	South Africa	7.25	7.06	7.21	7.25	874		1737
4	Guillaume Thierry	Mauritius	6.94w	6.87	x	6.94w	799		1547
5	Florent Lomba Bilisi	Democratic Republic of the Congo	6.61	6.76w	6.52	6.76w	757		1503
6	Walid Nsiri	Tunisia	6.75	6.62w	6.20	6.75	755		1522
7	Louis Fabrice Rajah	Mauritius	x	6.47	6.46	6.47	691		1390
8	Ali Kamé	Madagascar	x	x	6.40w	6.40w	675		1407
9	Ahmed Saber Ahmed	Egypt	5.74	5.93	5.74	5.93	571		1370

=== Shot put ===
Rank	Athlete	Nationality	#1	#2	#3	Result	Points	Notes	Total
1	Willem Coertzen	South Africa	13.82	13.88	13.73	13.88	721		2458
2	Guillaume Thierry	Mauritius	13.38	13.52	13.39	13.52	699		2246
3	Ahmed Saber Ahmed	Egypt	13.46	13.02	12.82	13.46	695		2065
4	Atsu Nyamadi	Ghana	11.85	12.81	13.40	13.40	692		2380
5	Larbi Bouraada	Algeria	13.06	13.20	12.68	13.20	679		2484
6	Walid Nsiri	Tunisia	12.06	12.76	x	12.76	653		2175
7	Ali Kamé	Madagascar	11.86	x	12.39	12.39	630		2037
8	Louis Fabrice Rajah	Mauritius	12.08	11.96	11.77	12.08	611		2001
9	Florent Lomba Bilisi	Democratic Republic of the Congo	11.61	11.86	11.59	11.86	598		2101

=== High jump ===
Rank	Athlete	Nationality	1.50	1.62	1.65	1.68	1.74	1.77	1.80	1.83	1.86	1.89	1.92	1.95	1.98	2.01	2.04	2.07	Result	Points	Notes	Total
1	Larbi Bouraada	Algeria	–	–	–	–	–	–	–	–	o	–	o	xo	o	o	xo	xxx	2.04	840		3324
2	Florent Lomba Bilisi	Democratic Republic of the Congo	–	–	–	–	–	o	–	o	o	o	xxo	xxo	xxo	xxx			1.98	785		2886
3	Ali Kamé	Madagascar	–	–	–	–	o	o	o	o	o	o	xxo	xxx					1.92	731		2768
4	Willem Coertzen	South Africa	–	–	–	–	–	–	–	o	–	xo							1.89	705		3163
5	Louis Fabrice Rajah	Mauritius	–	–	–	–	–	o	o	o	xo	xxo	xxx						1.89	705		2706
5	Guillaume Thierry	Mauritius	–	–	–	–	–	–	o	o	xo	xxo	xxx						1.89	705		2951
7	Ahmed Saber Ahmed	Egypt	–	–	–	–	o	o	xo	o	xo	xxo	xxx						1.89	705		2770
8	Atsu Nyamadi	Ghana	–	–	–	–	–	–	xo	xo	xxo								1.86	679		3059
9	Walid Nsiri	Tunisia	o	xxo	xxo	xxx													1.65	504		2679

=== 400 metres ===
Rank	Lane	Name	Nationality	Time	Points	Notes	Total
1	1	Larbi Bouraada	Algeria	48.33	893		4217
2	7	Walid Nsiri	Tunisia	49.70	828		3507
3	5	Atsu Nyamadi	Ghana	50.06	812		3871
4	2	Florent Lomba Bilisi	Democratic Republic of the Congo	50.67	784		3670
5	4	Ahmed Saber Ahmed	Egypt	51.54	745		3515
6	8	Guillaume Thierry	Mauritius	51.91	729		3680
7	6	Ali Kamé	Madagascar	52.47	704		3472
8	3	Louis Fabrice Rajah	Mauritius	53.26	671		3377
		Willem Coertzen	South Africa	DNS	0		DNF

=== 110 metres hurdles ===
Wind: +0.2 m/s

Rank	Lane	Name	Nationality	Time	Points	Notes	Total
1	4	Larbi Bouraada	Algeria	14.33	932		5149
2	6	Florent Lomba Bilisi	Democratic Republic of the Congo	15.00	850		4520
3	7	Guillaume Thierry	Mauritius	15.09	839		4519
4	3	Atsu Nyamadi	Ghana	15.24	821		4692
5	8	Ali Kamé	Madagascar	15.28	816		4288
6	5	Louis Fabrice Rajah	Mauritius	15.40	802		4179
7	2	Walid Nsiri	Tunisia	17.20	604		4111
	1	Ahmed Saber Ahmed	Egypt	DQ	0	R162.5	3515

=== Discus throw ===
Rank	Athlete	Nationality	#1	#2	#3	Result	Points	Notes	Total
1	Atsu Nyamadi	Ghana	34.65	43.93	–	43.93	745		5437
2	Guillaume Thierry	Mauritius	41.89	41.83	41.02	41.89	703		5222
3	Walid Nsiri	Tunisia	35.97	38.06	41.13	41.13	688		4799
4	Larbi Bouraada	Algeria	34.22	39.08	39.99	39.99	664		5813
5	Ali Kamé	Madagascar	36.86	36.38	35.52	36.86	601		4889
6	Florent Lomba Bilisi	Democratic Republic of the Congo	33.91	31.86	31.52	33.91	542		5062
7	Louis Fabrice Rajah	Mauritius	x	31.53	32.16	32.16	507		4686
	Ahmed Saber Ahmed	Egypt				DNS	0		DNF

=== Pole vault ===
Rank	Athlete	Nationality	3.50	3.60	3.70	3.80	3.90	4.00	4.10	4.20	4.30	4.40	4.50	4.60	4.70	4.80	4.90	5.00	Result	Points	Notes	Total
1	Larbi Bouraada	Algeria	–	–	–	–	–	–	–	–	–	–	o	–	o	o	xo	xxx	4.90	880		6693
2	Guillaume Thierry	Mauritius	–	–	–	–	–	xxo	–	o	–	xo	xo	xxx					4.50	760		5982
3	Florent Lomba Bilisi	Democratic Republic of the Congo	–	–	–	o	–	o	o	xo	xxx								4.20	673		5735
4	Ali Kamé	Madagascar	–	–	–	o	–	o	o	xxx									4.10	645		5534
4	Louis Fabrice Rajah	Mauritius	–	o	o	o	o	o	o	xxx									4.10	645		5331
6	Walid Nsiri	Tunisia	o	xo	xxo	xxx													3.70	535		5334
	Atsu Nyamadi	Ghana																	NM	0		5437

=== Javelin throw ===
Rank	Athlete	Nationality	#1	#2	#3	Result	Points	Notes	Total
1	Larbi Bouraada	Algeria	64.60	61.71	57.77	64.60	807		7500
2	Atsu Nyamadi	Ghana	63.33	x	x	63.33	788		6225
3	Guillaume Thierry	Mauritius	56.57	60.94	57.47	60.94	752		6734
4	Ali Kamé	Madagascar	57.78	x	54.16	57.78	704		6238
5	Louis Fabrice Rajah	Mauritius	45.11	45.47	50.75	50.75	600		5931
6	Florent Lomba Bilisi	Democratic Republic of the Congo	45.02	49.08	x	49.08	575		6310
7	Walid Nsiri	Tunisia	x	46.15	41.67	46.15	532		5866

=== 1500 metres ===
Rank	Name	Nationality	Time	Points	Notes
1	Larbi Bouraada	Algeria	4:20.05	811	
2	Walid Nsiri	Tunisia	4:29.68	747	
3	Atsu Nyamadi	Ghana	4:33.58	721	
4	Ali Kamé	Madagascar	4:56.32	581	
5	Guillaume Thierry	Mauritius	4:56.81	578	
6	Louis Fabrice Rajah	Mauritius	4:58.85	566	
7	Florent Lomba Bilisi	Democratic Republic of the Congo	5:02.06	548	

=== Final standings ===
The highest mark recorded in each event is highlighted in yellow

Rank	Athlete	Nationality	100m	LJ	SP	HJ	400m	110m H	DT	PV	JT	1500m	Points	Notes
1st place, gold medalist(s)	Larbi Bouraada	Algeria	10.90	7.45	13.20	2.04	48.33	14.33	39.99	4.90	64.60	4:20.05	8311	
2nd place, silver medalist(s)	Guillaume Thierry	Mauritius	11.52	6.94w	13.52	1.89	51.91	15.09	41.89	4.50	60.94	4:56.81	7312	
3rd place, bronze medalist(s)	Atsu Nyamadi	Ghana	11.29	7.32w	13.40	1.86	50.06	15.24	43.93	NM	63.33	4:33.58	6946	
4	Florent Lomba Bilisi	Democratic Republic of the Congo	11.53	6.76w	11.86	1.98	50.67	15.00	33.91	4.20	49.08	5:02.06	6858	
5	Ali Kamé	Madagascar	11.60	6.40w	12.39	1.92	52.47	15.28	36.86	4.10	57.78	4:56.32	6819	
6	Walid Nsiri	Tunisia	11.43	6.75	12.76	1.65	49.70	17.20	41.13	3.70	46.15	4:29.68	6613	
7	Louis Fabrice Rajah	Mauritius	11.76	6.47	12.08	1.89	53.26	15.40	32.16	4.10	50.75	4:58.85	6497	
	Ahmed Saber Ahmed	Egypt	11.28	5.93	13.46	1.89	51.54	DQ	DNS	–	–	–	DNF	
	Willem Coertzen	South Africa	10.99	7.25	13.88	1.89	DNS	–	–	–	–	–	DNF	
