= Athletics at the 2011 All-Africa Games – Men's decathlon =

The Men's decathlon at the 2011 All-Africa Games took place between September 11 and 12, at the Estádio Nacional do Zimpeto.

== Medalists ==
Gold	Jangy Addy (LBR)
Silver	Guillaume Thierry (MRI)
Bronze	Ali Kamé (MAD)

== Records ==
Prior to this competition, the existing World, African record and World leading were as follows:

World record	Roman Šebrle (CZE)	9026 points	Götzis, Austria	27 May 2001
World leading	Ashton Eaton (USA)	8729 points	Eugene, United States	24 June 2011
African record	Larbi Bouraada (ALG)	8302 points	Ratingen, Germany	17 July 2011

== Results ==
(NR - National Record, PB - Person Best, SB - Season Best, = - Equaled)

=== 100m ===
11 September 2011 - 12:21 Wind: 0.0 m/s

Rank	Athlete	Country	Time	Points	Notes
1	Jangy Addy	Liberia	10.61	949	PB
2	Ali Kamé	Madagascar	11.00	861	PB
3	Mourad Souissi	Algeria	11.03	854	PB
4	Guillaume Thierry	Mauritius	11.22	812	PB
5	Lee Okoroafor	Nigeria	11.30	795	PB
6	Ahmed Saad Hamed	Egypt	11.40	774	SB
	Larbi Bouraada	Algeria	DQ	0	

=== Long Jump ===
11 September 2011

Rank	Athlete	Country	Distance	Wind	Points	Notes
1	Jangy Addy	Liberia	7.76	-0.5	1000	PB
3	Lee Okoroafor	Nigeria	7.70	+0.1	985	PB
2	Ali Kamé	Madagascar	7.21	+0.4	864	
4	Mourad Souissi	Algeria	6.95	-1.8	802	SB
5	Guillaume Thierry	Mauritius	6.89	-0.9	788	
6	Ahmed Saad Hamed	Egypt	6.80	0.0	767	SB

=== Shot Put ===
11 September 2011

Rank	Athlete	Country	Distance	Points	Notes
1	Jangy Addy	Liberia	15.38	813	SB
3	Guillaume Thierry	Mauritius	14.18	740	
2	Ali Kamé	Madagascar	13.67	709	PB
4	Mourad Souissi	Algeria	13.55	701	
5	Ahmed Saad Hamed	Egypt	13.26	683	
6	Lee Okoroafor	Nigeria	12.72	651	PB

=== High Jump ===
11 September 2011

Rank	Athlete	Country	Height	Points	Notes
1	Jangy Addy	Liberia	1.92	731	SB
2	Ali Kamé	Madagascar	1.92	731	
3	Lee Okoroafor	Nigeria	1.83	653	PB
4	Guillaume Thierry	Mauritius	1.83	653	
5	Mourad Souissi	Algeria	1.74	577	
	Ahmed Saad Hamed	Egypt	NM	0	

=== 400m ===
11 September 2011

Rank	Athlete	Country	Time	Points	Notes
1	Jangy Addy	Liberia	48.75	874	
2	Mourad Souissi	Algeria	50.62	787	
3	Lee Okoroafor	Nigeria	51.18	761	
4	Ali Kamé	Madagascar	52.14	719	
5	Guillaume Thierry	Mauritius	52.33	711	

=== 110m Hurdles ===
12 September 2011

Rank	Athlete	Country	Time	Points	Notes
1	Jangy Addy	Liberia	14.15	955	SB
2	Mourad Souissi	Algeria	14.93	858	
3	Guillaume Thierry	Mauritius	15.06	842	PB
4	Ali Kamé	Madagascar	15.16	830	
5	Lee Okoroafor	Nigeria	15.21	824	PB

=== Discus Throw ===
12 September 2011

Rank	Athlete	Country	Mark	Points	Notes
1	Jangy Addy	Liberia	48.14	832	PB
2	Guillaume Thierry	Mauritius	47.68	823	PB
3	Lee Okoroafor	Nigeria	39.01	645	PB
4	Mourad Souissi	Algeria	37.60	616	
5	Ali Kamé	Madagascar	35.10	566	

=== Pole Vault ===
12 September 2011

Rank	Athlete	Country	Mark	Points	Notes
1	Jangy Addy	Liberia	4.40	731	
2	Guillaume Thierry	Mauritius	4.40	731	=SB
3	Ali Kamé	Madagascar	4.40	731	=SB
4	Mourad Souissi	Algeria	4.40	731	SB
5	Lee Okoroafor	Nigeria	3.70	535	PB

=== Javelin Throw ===
12 September 2011

Rank	Athlete	Country	Time	Points	Notes
1	Guillaume Thierry	Mauritius	59.60	732	
2	Ali Kamé	Madagascar	59.42	730	SB
3	Lee Okoroafor	Liberia	53.20	637	PB
4	Mourad Souissi	Nigeria	53.07	635	
5	Jangy Addy	Liberia	50.71	600	

=== 1500m ===
12 September 2011

Rank	Athlete	Country	Time	Points	Notes
1	Mourad Souissi	Algeria	4:32.69	728	PB
2	Ali Kamé	Madagascar	4:37.33	698	
3	Guillaume Thierry	Mauritius	4:46.32	641	PB
4	Lee Okoroafor	Nigeria	4:50.40	617	PB
5	Jangy Addy	Liberia	5:08.88	510	SB

=== Final standings ===
Standings after Event 10
12 September 2011
Legend:W = Wind m/s, M = Mark, P = Points

Pos	Athlete	Country	Total Points	P/M/W	100M	Long Jump	Shot Put	High Jump	400M	110M Hurdles	Discus Throw	Pole Vault	Javelin Throw	1500M	Notes
1st place, gold medalist(s)	Jangy Addy	Liberia	7985	P M W	949; 10.61	1000; 7.76m -0.5	813; 15.38m	731; 1.92m	874; 48.75	955; 14.15	832; 48.14	731; 4.40	600; 50.71	510; 5:08.88	GR
2nd place, silver medalist(s)	Guillaume Thierry	Mauritius	7481	P M W	812; 11.22	788; 6.89m -0.9	740; 14.18m	653; 1.83m	711; 52.33	842; 15.06	823; 47.68	731; 4.40	732; 59.60	641; 4:46.32	NR
3rd place, bronze medalist(s)	Ali Kamé	Madagascar	7458	P M W	861; 11.00	864; 7.21m +0.4	709; 13.67m	731; 1.92m	719; 52.14	830; 15.16	566; 35.10	731; 4.40	730; 59.42	698; 4:37.33	
4	Mourad Souissi	Algeria	7289	P M W	854; 11.03	802; 6.95m -1.8	701; 13.55m	577; 1.74m	787; 50.62	858; 14.93	616; 37.60	731; 4.40	635; 53.07	728; 4:32.69	
5	Lee Okoroafor	Nigeria	7103	P M W	795; 11.30	985; 7.70m +0.1	651; 12.72m	653; 1.83m	761; 51.18	824; 15.21	645; 39.01	535; 3.70	637; 53.20	617; 4:50.40	
6	Ahmed Saad Hamed	Egypt	DNF	P M W	774; 11.40	767; 6.80m	683; 13.26m	0 NM							
7	Larbi Bouraada	Algeria	DNF	P M W	0 DQ										
8	Ezeofo Kenechukukwa	Nigeria	DNS	P M W											
