= Athletics at the 2015 African Games – Men's decathlon =

The men's decathlon event at the 2015 African Games was held on 13–14 September.

== Medalists ==
Gold	Silver	Bronze
Guillaume Thierry; Mauritius	Atsu Nyamadi; Ghana	Fredriech Pretorius; South Africa

== Results ==
=== 100 metres ===
Wind: -0.1 m/s

Rank	Lane	Name	Nationality	Time	Points	Notes
1	7	Peter Moreno	Nigeria	10.95	872	
2	8	Peter Keegan Cook	Zimbabwe	11.28	799	
3	5	Fredriech Pretorius	South Africa	11.39	776	
4	2	Atsu Nyamadi	Ghana	11.42	769	
5	6	Guillaume Thierry	Mauritius	11.57	738	
6	4	Florent Bilisi Lomba	DR Congo	11.80	691	
7	3	Gilbert Koech	Kenya	11.86	679	
8	9	Elijah Cheruiyot	Kenya	11.91	669	

=== Long jump ===
Rank	Athlete	Nationality	#1	#2	#3	Result	Points	Notes	Total
1	Atsu Nyamadi	Ghana	7.19	7.27	7.25	7.27	878		1647
2	Guillaume Thierry	Mauritius	6.88	7.15	x	7.15	850		1588
3	Fredriech Pretorius	South Africa	6.85	7.01	x	7.01	816		1592
4	Peter Keegan Cook	Zimbabwe	6.95	6.99	6.39	6.99	811		1610
5	Florent Bilisi Lomba	DR Congo	6.64	6.90	x	6.90	790		1481
6	Peter Moreno	Nigeria	4.99	6.70	6.55	6.70	743		1615
7	Elijah Cheruiyot	Kenya	6.55	6.69	6.61	6.69	741		1410
8	Gilbert Koech	Kenya	6.28	6.20	6.12	6.28	648		1327

=== Shot put ===
Rank	Athlete	Nationality	#1	#2	#3	Result	Points	Notes	Total
1	Guillaume Thierry	Mauritius	14.36	13.26	13.92	14.36	750		2338
2	Atsu Nyamadi	Ghana	13.29	13.05	13.46	13.46	695		2342
3	Peter Moreno	Nigeria	13.07	12.09	x	13.07	672		2287
4	Peter Keegan Cook	Zimbabwe	12.14	12.52	12.81	12.81	656		2266
5	Fredriech Pretorius	South Africa	12.35	12.71	11.69	12.71	650		2242
6	Florent Bilisi Lomba	DR Congo	11.78	12.01	12.07	12.07	611		2092
7	Elijah Cheruiyot	Kenya	10.36	10.12	x	10.36	507		1917
8	Gilbert Koech	Kenya	10.26	10.21	10.23	10.26	501		1828

=== High jump ===
Rank	Athlete	Nationality	1.70	1.76	1.79	1.82	1.85	1.88	1.91	1.94	1.97	2.00	2.03	Result	Points	Notes	Total
1	Florent Bilisi Lomba	DR Congo	–	–	–	o	–	o	o	o	xo	o	xxx	2.00	803		2895
2	Elijah Cheruiyot	Kenya	–	–	–	o	–	–	o	o	xo	xxo	xxx	2.00	803		2720
3	Peter Moreno	Nigeria	o	–	–	o	–	o	o	o	o	xxx		1.97	776		3063
4	Guillaume Thierry	Mauritius	–	–	o	o	o	o	xo	xxx				1.91	723		3061
5	Peter Keegan Cook	Zimbabwe	–	–	o	–	xo	xxo	xo	xxx				1.91	723		2989
6	Fredriech Pretorius	South Africa	–	–	–	o	–	xo	xxo	xxx				1.91	723		2965
7	Atsu Nyamadi	Ghana	–	–	–	o	o	–	xxx					1.85	670		3012
8	Gilbert Koech	Kenya	o	xxx										1.70	544		2372

=== 400 metres ===
Rank	Lane	Name	Nationality	Time	Points	Notes	Total
1	9	Peter Moreno	Nigeria	48.39	890		3953
2	4	Peter Keegan Cook	Zimbabwe	49.45	840		3829
3	8	Florent Bilisi Lomba	DR Congo	50.39	797		3692
4	2	Elijah Cheruiyot	Kenya	50.77	779		3499
5	3	Atsu Nyamadi	Ghana	50.87	775		3787
6	7	Fredriech Pretorius	South Africa	51.92	728		3693
7	6	Guillaume Thierry	Mauritius	51.92	700		3761
8	5	Gilbert Koech	Kenya	52.67	696		3068

=== 110 metres hurdles ===
Wind: +0.1 m/s

Rank	Lane	Name	Nationality	Time	Points	Notes	Total
1	9	Florent Bilisi Lomba	DR Congo	14.73	882		4574
2	4	Atsu Nyamadi	Ghana	14.93	858		4645
3	6	Guillaume Thierry	Mauritius	15.04	845		4606
4	2	Fredriech Pretorius	South Africa	15.25	820		4513
5	8	Peter Keegan Cook	Zimbabwe	15.27	817		4646
6	7	Elijah Cheruiyot	Kenya	15.77	759		4258
7	3	Peter Moreno	Nigeria	33.51	0		3953
	5	Gilbert Koech	Kenya	DNS	0		DNF

=== Discus throw ===
Rank	Athlete	Nationality	#1	#2	#3	Result	Points	Notes	Total
1	Guillaume Thierry	Mauritius	43.13	42.50	40.21	43.13	728		5334
2	Atsu Nyamadi	Ghana	x	40.08	x	40.08	666		5311
3	Peter Keegan Cook	Zimbabwe	36.39	32.18	35.08	36.39	592		5238
4	Fredriech Pretorius	South Africa	33.35	31.93	35.75	35.75	579		5092
5	Florent Bilisi Lomba	DR Congo	34.68	35.66	x	35.66	577		5151
6	Peter Moreno	Nigeria	31.80	31.82	x	31.82	500		4453
7	Elijah Cheruiyot	Kenya	31.16	29.51	29.93	31.16	487		4745

=== Pole vault ===
Rank	Athlete	Nationality	Result	Points	Notes	Total
1	Peter Moreno	Nigeria	4.60	790	NR	5243
2	Guillaume Thierry	Mauritius	4.40	790		6124
3	Fredriech Pretorius	South Africa	4.50	760		5852
4	Atsu Nyamadi	Ghana	4.00	617		5928
5	Florent Bilisi Lomba	DR Congo	3.90	590		5741
6	Elijah Cheruiyot	Kenya	3.20	406		5151
	Peter Keegan Cook	Zimbabwe	NM	0		5238

=== Javelin throw ===
Rank	Athlete	Nationality	#1	#2	#3	Result	Points	Notes	Total
1	Atsu Nyamadi	Ghana	63.81	65.24	x	65.24	817		6745
2	Guillaume Thierry	Mauritius	57.18	63.26	62.52	63.26	787		6911
3	Fredriech Pretorius	South Africa	52.05	60.00	x	60.00	738		6590
4	Peter Keegan Cook	Zimbabwe	55.13	57.68	53.30	57.68	703		5941
5	Florent Bilisi Lomba	DR Congo	45.85	44.60	48.26	48.26	563		6304
6	Elijah Cheruiyot	Kenya	41.94	38.76	44.74	44.74	511		5662
7	Peter Moreno	Nigeria	40.32	40.40	43.22	43.22	489		5732

=== 1500 metres ===
Rank	Name	Nationality	Time	Points	Notes
1	Elijah Cheruiyot	Kenya	4:26.86	765	
2	Atsu Nyamadi	Ghana	4:31.85	733	
3	Peter Keegan Cook	Zimbabwe	4:39.26	685	
4	Guillaume Thierry	Mauritius	4:39.97	680	
5	Fredriech Pretorius	South Africa	4:53.76	596	
6	Florent Bilisi Lomba	DR Congo	5:01.31	552	
7	Peter Moreno	Nigeria	5:01.88	549	

=== Final standings ===
The highest mark recorded in each event is highlighted in yellow

Rank	Athlete	Nationality	100m	LJ	SP	HJ	400m	110m H	DT	PV	JT	1500m	Points	Notes
1st place, gold medalist(s)	Guillaume Thierry	Mauritius	11.57	7.15	14.36	1.91	52.57	15.04	43.13	4.60	63.26	4:39.97	7591	
2nd place, silver medalist(s)	Atsu Nyamadi	Ghana	11.42	7.27	13.46	1.85	50.87	14.93	40.08	4.00	65.24	4:31.85	7478	
3rd place, bronze medalist(s)	Fredriech Pretorius	South Africa	11.39	7.01	12.71	1.91	51.92	15.25	35.75	4.50	60.00	4:53.76	7186	
4	Florent Bilisi Lomba	DR Congo	11.80	6.90	12.07	2.00	50.39	14.73	35.66	3.90	48.26	5:01.31	6856	
5	Peter Keegan Cook	Zimbabwe	11.28	6.99	12.81	1.91	49.45	15.27	36.39	NM	57.68	4:39.26	6626	
6	Elijah Cheruiyot	Kenya	11.91	6.69	10.36	2.00	50.77	15.77	31.16	3.20	44.74	4:26.86	6427	
7	Peter Moreno	Nigeria	10.95	6.70	13.07	1.97	48.39	33.51	31.82	4.60	43.22	5:01.88	6281	
	Gilbert Koech	Kenya	11.86	6.28	10.26	1.70	52.67	DNS	–	–	–	–	DNF	
