= 2002 African Championships in Athletics – Men's pole vault =

The men's pole vault event at the 2002 African Championships in Athletics was held in Radès, Tunisia on August 7.

== Results ==
| Rank | Name | Nationality | Result | Notes |
|---|---|---|---|---|
| 1st place, gold medalist(s) | Karim Sène | Senegal | 5.00 | |
| 2nd place, silver medalist(s) | Béchir Zaghouani | Tunisia | 4.90 | |
| 3rd place, bronze medalist(s) | Mohamed Benhadia | Algeria | 4.80 | |
| | Rafik Mefti | Algeria | NM | |
