= 2008 African Championships in Athletics – Men's decathlon =

The men's decathlon event at the 2008 African Championships in Athletics was held at the Addis Ababa Stadium on April 30–May 1.

== Medalists ==
Gold	Silver	Bronze
Larbi Bouraada; Algeria	Willem Coertzen; South Africa	Boualem Lamri; Algeria

== Results ==
=== 100 metres ===
Wind: 0.0 m/s

Rank	Lane	Name	Nationality	Time	Points	Notes
1	8	Larbi Bouraada	Algeria	10.92	878	
2	2	Willem Coertzen	South Africa	11.08	843	
3	7	Boualem Lamri	Algeria	11.23	810	
4	6	Ahmad Saad	Egypt	11.30	795	
5	4	Ali Kamé	Madagascar	11.48	757	
6	3	Hakim Alaoui	Morocco	11.72	707	FS1
7	1	Guillaume Thierry	Mauritius	13.68	359	
	5	Thierry Saint-Jean Makiemba	Gabon	DNS	0	

=== Long jump ===
Rank	Athlete	Nationality	#1	#2	#3	Result	Points	Notes	Overall
1	Larbi Bouraada	Algeria	7.24	7.19	7.33	7.33	893		1771
2	Willem Coertzen	South Africa	7.22	7.33	x	7.33	893		1736
3	Boualem Lamri	Algeria	x	6.70	7.29	7.29	883		1693
4	Ahmad Saad	Egypt	6.52	6.96	6.61	6.96	804		1599
5	Hakim Alaoui	Morocco	6.75	6.80	6.87	6.87	783		1490
6	Ali Kamé	Madagascar	6.58	6.58	6.66	6.66	734		1491
	Guillaume Thierry	Mauritius				DNS	0		DNF

=== Shot put ===
Rank	Athlete	Nationality	#1	#2	#3	Result	Points	Notes	Overall
1	Ahmad Saad	Egypt	13.41	x	13.38	13.41	692		2291
2	Willem Coertzen	South Africa	12.37	12.17	12.32	12.37	629		2365
3	Ali Kamé	Madagascar	11.36	11.77	11.94	11.94	603		2094
4	Larbi Bouraada	Algeria	10.47	x	11.78	11.78	593		2364
5	Hakim Alaoui	Morocco	10.99	11.48	11.61	11.61	583		2073
6	Boualem Lamri	Algeria	11.26	x	x	11.26	562		2255

=== High jump ===
Rank	Athlete	Nationality	1.70	1.76	1.79	1.82	1.85	1.88	1.91	1.94	1.97	2.00	2.03	Result	Points	Notes	Overall
1	Hakim Alaoui	Morocco	–	–	xo	o	o	o	o	xo	o	xo	xxx	2.00	803		2876
2	Boualem Lamri	Algeria	–	–	o	o	o	o	o	xo	o	xxo	xxx	2.00	803		3058
3	Larbi Bouraada	Algeria	–	–	o	–	o	o	o	xo	xxx			1.94	749		3113
4	Willem Coertzen	South Africa	–	–	o	o	xo	o	xo	xo	xxx			1.94	749		3114
5	Ali Kamé	Madagascar	o	o	o	o	o	xxx						1.85	670		2764
6	Ahmad Saad	Egypt	–	xxo	xxx									1.76	593		2884

=== 400 metres ===
Rank	Lane	Name	Nationality	Time	Points	Notes	Overall
1	2	Larbi Bouraada	Algeria	48.39	890		4003
2	1	Boualem Lamri	Algeria	49.90	819		3877
3	5	Willem Coertzen	South Africa	49.99	815		3929
4	4	Ali Kamé	Madagascar	50.60	787		3551
5	3	Hakim Alaoui	Morocco	52.35	709		3585
	6	Ahmad Saad	Egypt	DNS	0		DNF

=== 110 metres hurdles ===
Wind: -2.4 m/s

Rank	Lane	Name	Nationality	Time	Points	Notes	Overall
1	5	Willem Coertzen	South Africa	14.61	897		4826
2	4	Boualem Lamri	Algeria	14.94	857		4734
3	6	Ali Kamé	Madagascar	15.13	834		4385
4	7	Larbi Bouraada	Algeria	15.32	811		4814
5	2	Hakim Alaoui	Morocco	15.52	788		4373

=== Discus throw ===
Rank	Athlete	Nationality	#1	#2	#3	Result	Points	Notes	Overall
1	Willem Coertzen	South Africa	38.95	40.04	x	40.04	665		5491
2	Boualem Lamri	Algeria	34.60	36.33	x	36.33	590		5324
3	Hakim Alaoui	Morocco	31.77	x	35.30	35.30	570		4943
4	Larbi Bouraada	Algeria	32.96	x	35.04	35.04	564		5378
5	Ali Kamé	Madagascar	31.48	33.88	32.12	33.88	541		4926

=== Pole vault ===
Rank	Athlete	Nationality	3.50	3.60	3.70	3.80	3.90	4.00	4.30	4.50	4.60	4.70	Result	Points	Notes	Overall
1	Larbi Bouraada	Algeria	–	–	–	–	–	–	o	–	xxo	xxx	4.60	790		6168
2	Ali Kamé	Madagascar	xxo	–	o	–	o	o	–	xxx			4.00	617		5543
3	Willem Coertzen	South Africa	o	–	o	–	o	xxx					3.90	590		6081
4	Boualem Lamri	Algeria	–	xxo	o	xxx							3.70	535		5859
5	Hakim Alaoui	Morocco	xo	o	xxx								3.60	509		5452

=== Javelin throw ===
Rank	Athlete	Nationality	#1	#2	#3	Result	Points	Notes	Overall
1	Willem Coertzen	South Africa	63.70	64.09	63.81	64.09	800		6881
2	Larbi Bouraada	Algeria	60.59	59.42	59.75	60.59	747		6915
3	Ali Kamé	Madagascar	55.50	x	56.28	56.28	682		6225
4	Hakim Alaoui	Morocco	x	x	46.46	46.46	536		5988
5	Boualem Lamri	Algeria	45.78	45.11	46.09	46.09	531		6390

=== 1500 metres ===
Rank	Name	Nationality	Time	Points	Notes
1	Larbi Bouraada	Algeria	4:43.33	659	
2	Ali Kamé	Madagascar	5:01.94	549	
3	Boualem Lamri	Algeria	5:05.42	529	
4	Willem Coertzen	South Africa	5:12.00	493	
	Hakim Alaoui	Morocco	DNF	0	

=== Final standings ===
The highest mark recorded in each event is highlighted in yellow

Rank	Athlete	Nationality	100m	LJ	SP	HJ	400m	110m H	DT	PV	JT	1500m	Points	Notes
1st place, gold medalist(s)	Larbi Bouraada	Algeria	10.92	7.33	11.78	1.94	48.39	15.32	35.04	4.60	60.59	4:43.33	7574	
2nd place, silver medalist(s)	Willem Coertzen	South Africa	11.08	7.33	12.37	1.94	49.99	14.61	40.04	3.90	64.09	5:12.00	7374	
3rd place, bronze medalist(s)	Boualem Lamri	Algeria	11.23	7.29	11.26	2.00	49.90	14.94	36.33	3.70	46.09	5:05.42	6919	
4	Ali Kamé	Madagascar	11.48	6.66	11.94	1.85	50.60	15.13	33.88	4.00	56.28	5:01.94	6774	NR
5	Hakim Alaoui	Morocco	11.72	6.87	11.61	2.00	52.35	15.52	35.30	3.60	46.46	DNF	5988	
	Ahmad Saad	Egypt	11.30	6.96	13.41	1.76	DNS	–	–	–	–	–	DNF	
	Guillaume Thierry	Mauritius	13.68	DNS	–	–	–	–	–	–	–	–	DNF	
	Thierry Saint-Jean Makiemba	Gabon	DNS	–	–	–	–	–	–	–	–	–	DNS	
