= Mourad Souissi =

Algerian athlete

Medal record

Men's athletics

Representing Algeria

African Championships
Silver medal – second place	2006 Bambous	Decathlon
Silver medal – second place	2010 Nairobi	Decathlon
Silver medal – second place	2012 Porto-Novo	Decathlon
Bronze medal – third place	2010 Nairobi	Pole vault

Mourad Souissi (born 7 July 1984) is an Algerian athlete who competes in the decathlon and occasionally in the pole vault. He is a multiple medalist at continental level.

== Competition record ==
Year	Competition	Venue	Position	Event	Notes
Representing Algeria
2005	Islamic Solidarity Games	Mecca, Saudi Arabia	2nd	Decathlon	6866 pts
2006	African Championships	Bambous, Mauritius	2nd	Decathlon	7113 pts
2007	All-Africa Games	Algiers, Algeria	8th	Decathlon	4264 pts
2010	African Championships	Nairobi, Kenya	3rd	Pole vault	4.40 m
2010	African Championships	Nairobi, Kenya	2nd	Decathlon	7818 pts
2011	All-Africa Games	Maputo, Mozambique	2nd	Pole vault	4.00 m
2011	All-Africa Games	Maputo, Mozambique	4th	Decathlon	7289 pts
2011	Pan Arab Games	Doha, Qatar	–	Pole vault	NM
2011	Pan Arab Games	Doha, Qatar	3rd	Decathlon	7220 pts
2012	African Championships	Porto-Novo, Benin	2nd	Decathlon	7000 pts

== Personal bests ==
- 100 metres – 11.12 (-1.2) (Nairobi 2010)
- 400 metres – 47.64 (Nairobi 2010)
- 1500 metres – 4:35.40 (Bambous 2006)
- 110 metres hurdles – 14.51 (+1.3) (Arles 2009)
- High jump – 1.94 (Bambous 2006)
- Pole vault – 4.60 (Nairobi 2010)
- Long jump – 7.22 (-1.1) (Nairobi 2010)
- Shot put – 14.85 (Réduit 2011)
- Discus throw – 41.94 (Arles 2009)
- Javelin throw – 57.74 (Algiers 2007)
- Decathlon – 7818 (Nairobi 2010)
