= Athletics at the 2003 All-Africa Games – Men's pole vault =

The men's pole vault event at the 2003 All-Africa Games was held on October 14.

== Results ==
Rank	Name	Nationality	Result	Notes
1st place, gold medalist(s)	Béchir Zaghouani	Tunisia	5.20	
2nd place, silver medalist(s)	Fanie Jacobs	South Africa	5.20	
3rd place, bronze medalist(s)	Karim Sène	Senegal	5.00	
4	Rafik Mefti	Algeria	4.90	
