= Karim Sène =

Senegalese pole vaulter

Medal record

Men's athletics

Representing Senegal

African Championships
Gold medal – first place	2002 Radès	Pole vault
Silver medal – second place	2000 Algiers	Pole vault
Silver medal – second place	2004 Brazzaville	Pole vault

Karim Sène (born 26 August 1971 in Condat, Cantal, France) is a retired Senegalese athlete who specialized in the pole vault. He won multiple medals on the regional level throughout his career.

He has personal bests of 5.21 metres outdoors (2003) and 5.14 metres indoors (2007). Both are current Senegalese records.

== Competition record ==
Year	Competition	Venue	Position	Notes
Representing Senegal
2000	African Championships	Algiers, Algeria	2nd	4.80 m
2001	Jeux de la Francophonie	Ottawa, Canada	7th	4.95 m
2002	African Championships	Radès, Tunisia	1st	5.00 m
2003	All-Africa Games	Abuja, Nigeria	3rd	5.00 m
2003	Afro-Asian Games	Hyderabad, India	2nd	5.05 m
2004	African Championships	Brazzaville, Republic of the Congo	2nd	5.00 m
2005	Jeux de la Francophonie	Niamey, Niger	6th	4.80 m
2006	African Championships	Bambous, Mauritius	3rd	4.80 m
2007	All-Africa Games	Algiers, Algeria	2nd	5.10 m
