= 2008 African Championships in Athletics – Men's pole vault =

The men's pole vault event at the 2008 African Championships in Athletics was held at the Addis Ababa Stadium on May 3.

== Results ==
Rank	Athlete	Nationality	3.50	4.00	4.50	4.65	4.80	5.00	Result	Notes
1st place, gold medalist(s)	Mouhcine Cheaouri	Morocco	–	–	–	xxo	xo	xxx	4.80	
2nd place, silver medalist(s)	Larbi Bouraada	Algeria	–	o	o	–	xxx		4.50	
3rd place, bronze medalist(s)	Willem Coertzen	South Africa	o	xxo	xxx				4.00	
	Abderamane Tamada	Tunisia	–	–	–	xxx			NM	
	Seatu Tilahun	Ethiopia	xxx						NM	
	Yared Asefa	Ethiopia	x						NM	
