= Abderrahmane Tamada =

Tunisian pole vaulter (born 1985)

Medal record

Men's athletics

Representing Tunisia

All-Africa Games
Gold medal – first place	2007 Algiers	Pole vault

African Championships
Silver medal – second place	2006 Bambous	Pole vault

Abderrahmane Tamada (born 6 October 1985) is a Tunisian former track and field athlete who competed in the pole vault. His personal best of 5.15 m (16 ft 10 3/4 in) was achieved in 2006. He was the gold medallist at the 2007 All-Africa Games and runner-up at the 2006 African Championships in Athletics. He won medals at the Arab Junior Athletics Championships, Arab Athletics Championships and the Pan Arab Games.

== International competitions ==
Year	Competition	Venue	Position	Event	Notes
2004	Arab Junior Championships	Damascus, Syria	2nd	Pole vault	4.70 m
2005	Arab Championships	Tunis, Tunisia	3rd	Pole vault	4.80 m
2006	African Championships	Bambous, Mauritius	2nd	Pole vault	5.15 m
2007	Pan Arab Games	Cairo, Egypt	2nd	Pole vault	4.90 m
2007	All-Africa Games	Algiers, Algeria	1st	Pole vault	5.10 m
2008	African Championships	Addis Ababa, Ethiopia	—	Pole vault	NM
