= 2010 African Championships in Athletics – Men's decathlon =

Athletics event

The men's decathlon at the 2010 African Championships in Athletics was held on July 28–29.

== Medalists ==
Gold	Silver	Bronze
Larbi Bouraada; Algeria	Mourad Souissi; Algeria	Guillaume Thierry; Mauritius

== Results ==
=== 100 metres ===
Rank	Heat	Name	Nationality	Time	Points	Notes
1	1	Larbi Bouraada	Algeria	10.78	910	
2	1	Hamdi Dhouibi	Tunisia	11.09	841	
3	2	Mourad Souissi	Algeria	11.12	834	PB
4	2	George Joubert	South Africa	11.23	810	
5	2	Ali Kamé	Madagascar	11.39	776	SB
6	2	Abdallah Mohamed Saad Hamed	Egypt	11.42	769	SB
7	1	Washington Nyakundi	Kenya	11.43	767	
8	1	Guillaume Thierry	Mauritius	11.50	753	=PB
9	2	Alexander Tum	Kenya	11.83	685	
10	1	Cornelius Rotich	Kenya	12.44	567	
	1	Richard Chitambi	Zambia	DNS	0	
	2	Clave Folokwe	Zambia	DNS	0	

=== Long jump ===
Rank	Athlete	Nationality	#1	#2	#3	Result	Points	Notes	Overall
1	Larbi Bouraada	Algeria	7.43	7.42	–	7.43	918		1828
2	Mourad Souissi	Algeria	7.22	7.10	7.09	7.22	866	PB	1700
3	Ali Kamé	Madagascar	7.04	7.09	7.16	7.16	852	SB	1628
4	Hamdi Dhouibi	Tunisia	6.93	X	7.02	7.02	818	SB	1659
5	Guillaume Thierry	Mauritius	6.75	6.79	6.97	6.97	807		1560
6	Abdallah Mohamed Saad Hamed	Egypt	6.85	6.71	6.91	6.91	792	SB	1561
7	George Joubert	South Africa	6.58	6.86	6.74	6.86	781		1591
8	Alexander Tum	Kenya	6.57	X	X	6.57	713		1398
9	Washington Nyakundi	Kenya	5.85	5.90	5.96	5.96	578		1345
10	Cornelius Rotich	Kenya	5.45	5.73	5.43	5.73	529		1096

=== Shot put ===
Rank	Athlete	Nationality	#1	#2	#3	Result	Points	Notes	Overall
1	Mourad Souissi	Algeria	13.79	13.88	14.53	14.53	761	PB	2461
2	Hamdi Dhouibi	Tunisia	14.00	14.22	13.81	14.22	742	SB	2401
3	Guillaume Thierry	Mauritius	12.71	12.91	13.68	13.68	709		2269
4	Larbi Bouraada	Algeria	13.59	13.15	12.38	13.59	703	PB	2531
5	Abdallah Mohamed Saad Hamed	Egypt	13.34	12.50	13.18	13.34	688	SB	2249
6	George Joubert	South Africa	11.68	11.96	12.31	12.31	625		2216
7	Ali Kamé	Madagascar	12.27	11.63	12.20	12.27	623		2251
8	Cornelius Rotich	Kenya	10.40	10.69	10.75	10.75	531		1627
9	Washington Nyakundi	Kenya	10.03	9.75	9.29	10.03	487		1832
10	Alexander Tum	Kenya	9.64	8.76	8.66	9.64	464		1862

=== High jump ===
Rank	Athlete	Nationality	1.65	1.68	1.71	1.74	1.77	1.80	1.83	1.86	1.89	1.92	1.95	1.98	2.01	2.04	2.07	Result	Points	Notes	Overall
1	Larbi Bouraada	Algeria	–	–	–	–	–	–	–	o	–	o	–	o	xo	xxo	x	2.04	840	SB	3371
2	Ali Kamé	Madagascar	–	–	–	o	–	xo	–	o	o	o	o	xxo	o	xx		2.01	813	PB	3064
3	Abdallah Mohamed Saad Hamed	Egypt	–	–	–	–	–	o	–	o	o	o	o	xxo	xxx			1.98	785	SB	3034
4	Hamdi Dhouibi	Tunisia	–	–	–	–	–	o	–	o	o	o	o	xxx				1.95	758	SB	3159
5	George Joubert	South Africa	–	–	–	–	–	o	–	o	o	o	xxx					1.92	731		2947
6	Mourad Souissi	Algeria	–	–	–	–	o	o	–	o	o	xo	xxx					1.92	731	SB	3192
7	Guillaume Thierry	Mauritius	–	–	–	xo	o	o	xo									1.83	653		2922
8	Washington Nyakundi	Kenya	–	o	o	o	o	o										1.80	627		2459
9	Alexander Tum	Kenya	o	o	o	xo	o											1.77	602		2464
10	Cornelius Rotich	Kenya	o	xo	xxo	xo	o											1.77	602		2229

=== 400 metres ===
Rank	Heat	Name	Nationality	Time	Points	Notes	Overall
1	2	Larbi Bouraada	Algeria	47.35	941		4312
2	1	Mourad Souissi	Algeria	47.64	927	PB	4119
3	2	Hamdi Dhouibi	Tunisia	48.98	862		4021
4	1	George Joubert	South Africa	49.83	822		3769
5	2	Washington Nyakundi	Kenya	50.00	815		3274
6	1	Abdallah Mohamed Saad Hamed	Egypt	51.46	749	SB	3783
7	2	Alexander Tum	Kenya	52.14	719		3183
8	2	Guillaume Thierry	Mauritius	52.34	710		3632
9	1	Cornelius Rotich	Kenya	52.70	694		2923
10	1	Ali Kamé	Madagascar	55.86	565		3629

=== 110 metres hurdles ===
Rank	Heat	Name	Nationality	Time	Points	Notes	Overall
1	1	Mourad Souissi	Algeria	14.55	905	SB	5024
2	1	George Joubert	South Africa	14.66	891		4660
3	2	Larbi Bouraada	Algeria	14.82	871	SB	5183
4	1	Hamdi Dhouibi	Tunisia	15.00	850		4871
5	1	Abdallah Mohamed Saad Hamed	Egypt	15.06	842	SB	4625
6	2	Ali Kamé	Madagascar	15.09	839	SB	4468
7	2	Guillaume Thierry	Mauritius	15.35	808	PB	4440
8	2	Washington Nyakundi	Kenya	16.29	700		3974
9	1	Cornelius Rotich	Kenya	17.66	557		3480
10	2	Alexander Tum	Kenya	18.11	514		3697

=== Discus throw ===
Rank	Athlete	Nationality	#1	#2	#3	Result	Points	Notes	Overall
1	Hamdi Dhouibi	Tunisia	43.88	X	41.04	43.88	744		5615
2	Cornelius Rotich	Kenya	42.12	X	X	42.12	708		4188
3	Mourad Souissi	Algeria	35.25	41.19	41.73	41.73	700	SB	5724
4	Guillaume Thierry	Mauritius	41.03	X	39.48	41.03	686		5126
5	Ali Kamé	Madagascar	31.87	35.90	36.38	36.38	591		5059
6	Abdallah Mohamed Saad Hamed	Egypt	33.44	36.36	X	36.36	591	SB	5216
7	Larbi Bouraada	Algeria	X	36.30	X	36.30	590		5773
8	George Joubert	South Africa	X	34.56	32.99	34.56	555		5215
9	Alexander Tum	Kenya	29.76	31.43	29.94	31.43	493		4190
10	Washington Nyakundi	Kenya	28.42	26.36	27.40	28.42	433		4407

=== Pole vault ===
Rank	Athlete	Nationality	2.50	2.60	2.70	2.80	2.90	3.00	3.20	3.30	3.60	3.80	4.00	4.10	4.20	4.30	4.40	4.50	4.60	4.70	4.80	Result	Points	Notes	Overall
1	Larbi Bouraada	Algeria	–	–	–	–	–	–	–	–	–	–	–	–	–	xo	o	o	o	xo	o	4.80	849	PB	6622
2	Mourad Souissi	Algeria	–	–	–	–	–	–	–	–	–	–	o	–	–	xxo	–	xo	xo	xxx		4.60	790	PB	6514
3	Ali Kamé	Madagascar	–	–	–	–	–	–	–	–	xxo	o	o	x–	o	xo	xxx					4.30	702	SB	5761
4	Guillaume Thierry	Mauritius	–	–	–	–	–	–	–	–	–	–	o	–	o	–	xxx					4.20	673		5799
5	Alexander Tum	Kenya	–	–	o	o	o	o	xo	xx												3.20	406		4596
6	Washington Nyakundi	Kenya	o	xo	o	o	xxx															2.80	309		4716
	Hamdi Dhouibi	Tunisia	–	–	–	–	–	–	–	–	–	–	xxx									NM	0		5615
	Abdallah Mohamed Saad Hamed	Egypt	–	–	–	–	–	–	–	–	–	–	xxx									NM	0		5216
	Cornelius Rotich	Kenya	xxx																			NM	0		4188
	George Joubert	South Africa																				DNS	0		DNF

=== Javelin throw ===
Rank	Athlete	Nationality	#1	#2	#3	Result	Points	Notes	Overall
1	Larbi Bouraada	Algeria	62.01	65.53	–	65.53	821	PB	7443
2	Guillaume Thierry	Mauritius	60.99	56.66	57.52	60.99	753	SB	6552
3	Ali Kamé	Madagascar	57.07	57.35	54.19	57.35	698		6459
4	Abdallah Mohamed Saad Hamed	Egypt	56.41	50.49	48.26	56.41	684	PB	5900
5	Mourad Souissi	Algeria	49.78	–	54.31	54.31	653	SB	7167
6	Hamdi Dhouibi	Tunisia	X	X	47.90	47.90	558		6173
7	Cornelius Rotich	Kenya	X	41.89	45.45	45.45	522		4710
8	Washington Nyakundi	Kenya	44.19	X	40.26	44.19	503		5219
	Alexander Tum	Kenya				DNS	0		DNF

=== 1500 metres ===
Rank	Name	Nationality	Time	Points	Notes
1	Cornelius Rotich	Kenya	4:19.72	813	
2	Washington Nyakundi	Kenya	4:33.60	721	
3	Larbi Bouraada	Algeria	4:36.04	705	SB
4	Mourad Souissi	Algeria	4:44.74	651	SB
5	Ali Kamé	Madagascar	4:50.86	613	
6	Guillaume Thierry	Mauritius	5:01.98	548	
	Hamdi Dhouibi	Tunisia	DNS	0	
	Abdallah Mohamed Saad Hamed	Egypt	DNS	0	

=== Final results ===
The highest mark recorded in each event is highlighted in yellow

Rank	Athlete	Nationality	100m	LJ	SP	HJ	400m	110m H	DT	PV	JT	1500m	Points	Notes
1st place, gold medalist(s)	Larbi Bouraada	Algeria	10.78	7.43	13.59	2.04	47.35	15.82	36.30	4.80	65.53	4:36.04	8148	CR
2nd place, silver medalist(s)	Mourad Souissi	Algeria	11.12	7.22	14.53	1.92	47.64	14.55	41.73	4.60	54.31	4:44.74	7818	PB
3rd place, bronze medalist(s)	Guillaume Thierry	Mauritius	11.50	6.97	13.68	1.83	52.34	15.35	41.03	4.20	60.99	5:01.98	7100	
4	Ali Kamé	Madagascar	11.39	7.16	12.27	2.01	55.86	15.09	36.38	4.30	57.35	4:50.86	7072	
5	Washington Nyakundi	Kenya	11.43	5.96	10.03	1.80	50.00	16.29	28.42	2.80	44.19	4:33.60	5940	
6	Cornelius Rotich	Kenya	12.44	5.73	10.75	1.77	52.70	17.66	42.12	NM	45.45	4:19.72	5523	
	Hamdi Dhouibi	Tunisia	11.09	7.02	14.22	1.95	48.98	15.00	43.88	NM	47.90	DNS	DNF	
	Abdallah Mohamed Saad Hamed	Egypt	11.42	6.91	13.34	1.98	51.46	15.06	36.36	NM	56.41	DNS	DNF	
	Alexander Tum	Kenya	11.83	6.57	9.64	1.77	52.14	18.11	31.43	3.20	DNS	–	DNF	
	George Joubert	South Africa	11.23	6.86	12.31	1.92	49.83	14.66	34.56	DNS	–	–	DNF	
	Richard Chitambi	Zambia	DNS	–	–	–	–	–	–	–	–	–	DNS	
	Clave Folokwe	Zambia	DNS	–	–	–	–	–	–	–	–	–	DNS	
