= Athletics at the 2007 All-Africa Games – Men's decathlon =

Athletics event

The men's decathlon at the 2007 All-Africa Games was held on July 18–19.

== Results ==
The highest mark recorded in each event is highlighted in yellow

Rank	Athlete	Nationality	100m	LJ	SP	HJ	400m	110m H	DT	PV	JT	1500m	Points	Notes
1st place, gold medalist(s)	Hamdi Dhouibi	Tunisia	10.88	6.83	13.89	1.85	48.65	14.36	41.52	5.00	52.99	4:31.08	7838	
2nd place, silver medalist(s)	Boualem Lamri	Algeria	11.09	7.35	10.99	2.06	49.40	14.39	35.54	4.20	48.59	4:29.56	7473	
3rd place, bronze medalist(s)	Larbi Bouraada	Algeria	11.15	6.61	10.66	2.00	49.54	15.28	32.28	4.50	48.59	4:18.09	7349	
4	Ahmed Mohamad Saad	Egypt	11.35	6.90	12.81	1.91	50.83	15.40	40.34	4.40	53.32	4:37.23	7270	
5	Guillaume Thierry	Mauritius	11.40	6.49	13.36	1.79	51.69	15.52	45.17	4.80	57.17	4:58.48	7186	
6	Terry Wepener	South Africa	11.45	6.45	11.49	2.06	50.85	14.79	35.20	4.30	56.18	4:53.14	7085	
7	Ali Kamé	Madagascar	11.39	6.64	11.35	1.85	50.02	14.97	35.34	4.00	60.43	4:41.27	7012	
8	Mourad Souissi	Algeria	DQ	7.03w	12.46	1.85	49.18	DNF	38.61	NM	54.15	DNF	4264	
