= Ali Kamé =

Malagasy track and field athlete (born 1984)

Medal record

Men's athletics

Representing Madagascar

All-Africa Games
Bronze medal – third place	2011 Maputo	Decathlon

African Championships
Gold medal – first place	2012 Porto-Novo	Decathlon
Bronze medal – third place	2016 Durban	Decathlon

Ali Kamé (born 21 May 1984) is a Malagasy track and field athlete who competes in the decathlon. He won the gold medal at the 2012 African Championships in Athletics and was a bronze medallist at the 2011 All-Africa Games. His personal best of 7685 points is the Malagasy record and he is a three-time winner of the African Combined Events Championships.

== Biography ==
Born in Namakia in Madagascar's Mitsinjo District, he began to compete internationally in the decathlon in 2007. A national record of 6564 points at the Multistars meeting was followed by a wind-assisted 6740 points in Arles. The 2007 All-Africa Games was his first outing for Madagascar and he placed seventh with a Malagasy record score of 7012 points.

He added a point to this tally at an African Combined Events meeting in Réduit in April 2008. At the 2008 African Championships in Athletics, held a month later, he came close to the podium with a fourth-place finish. He returned to the European circuit that year, but placed 21st at both the Multistars and Arles meets. The re-establishment of the African Combined Events Championships in Mauritius in 2009 saw him win his first regional title with a record mark of 7363 points. This proved to be his sole complete decathlon that year, as he failed to finish at his two regular European meets.

Kamé began training at the IAAF High Performance Training Centre in Mauritius and he scored 7314 points in Réduit in April. He again collected over seven thousand points at the Multistars meet, taking fourteenth place as Africa's top performer. In his third and final decathlon that year he came fourth at the 2010 African Championships in Athletics, repeating his finish from 2008. He returned and defended his Combined Events African title in 2011 with a national record score of 7685 points. He had his first top ten placing at Multistars and then won his first medal at a major competition, totalling 7458 points for the bronze medal at the 2011 All-Africa Games behind Jangy Addy and Guillaume Thierry.

His good form continued into 2012 as he began by winning a third African Combined Events title ahead of Theirry. He was again top ten at the Multistars meet and was sixth at the TNT – Fortuna Meeting with a score of 7443 points. Later that June he won his first major continental title at the 2012 African Championships in Athletics, although the field of competitors was small.

== Competition record ==
Year	Competition	Venue	Position	Event	Notes
Representing Madagascar
2007	All-Africa Games	Algiers, Algeria	4th	Shot put	17.91 m
2007	All-Africa Games	Algiers, Algeria	7th	Decathlon	7012 pts
2008	African Championships	Addis Ababa, Ethiopia	4th	Decathlon	6774 pts
2010	African Championships	Nairobi, Kenya	4th	Decathlon	7072 pts
2011	All-Africa Games	Maputo, Mozambique	3rd	Decathlon	7458 pts
2012	African Championships	Porto-Novo, Benin	1st	Decathlon	7252 pts
2012	Olympic Games	London, United Kingdom	–	110 m hurdles	DQ
2013	World Championships	Moscow, Russia	–	Decathlon	DNF
2013	Jeux de la Francophonie	Nice, France	4th	Decathlon	7456 pts
2014	African Championships	Marrakesh, Morocco	5th	Decathlon	6819 pts
2016	African Championships	Durban, South Africa	3rd	Decathlon	6892 pts
2016	Olympic Games	Rio de Janeiro, Brazil	36th (h)	110 m hurdles	14.89
