= Athletics at the 2014 Commonwealth Games – Men's decathlon =

Men's decathlon at the Commonwealth Games

The Men's decathlon at the 2014 Commonwealth Games as part of the athletics programme was held at Hampden Park on 28 and 29 July 2014.

Australian Jake Stein effectively took himself out of the competition before completing the first event by false starting twice in the 100 metres. However he persevered through the other nine events and while officially finishing in last place, he put in a performance worthy of the top 5.

== Results ==
The best performance for each event is highlighted.

Rank	Athlete	Overall points	100 m	LJ	SP	HJ	400 m	110 m H	DT	PV	JT	1500 m
1st place, gold medalist(s)	Damian Warner (CAN)	8282	10.29 s 1025	7.50 m 935	14.04 m 731	1.96 m 767	47.78 s 920	13.50 s 1040	41.31 m 691	4.50 m 760	61.96 m 767	4:45.43 s 646
2nd place, silver medalist(s)	Ashley Bryant (ENG)	8109	11.10 s 838	7.56 m 950	14.07 m 733	1.99 m 794	49.07 s 858	14.92 s 859	43.45 m 735	4.70 m 819	66.24 m 832	4:38.24 s 691
3rd place, bronze medalist(s)	Kurt Felix (GRN)	8070	11.02 s 856	7.43 m 918	13.26 m 683	2.11 m 906	48.93 s 865	15.06 s 842	45.3 m 773	4.50 m 760	66.33 m 834	4:47.66 s 633
4	John Lane (ENG)	7922	10.71 s 926	7.50 m 935	14.12 m 736	1.99 m 794	48.13 s 903	14.64 s 894	38.96 m 643	4.90 m 880	52.25 m 622	4:54.95 s 589
5	Stephen Cain (AUS)	7787	11.33 s 789	6.73 m 750	13.87 m 720	1.99 m 794	51.07 s 766	14.85 s 868	44.87 m 764	4.90 m 880	62.68 m 778	4:40.29 s 678
6	Benjamin Gregory (WAL)	7725	11.26 s 804	7.42 m 915	13.03 m 669	1.90 m 714	50.49 s 792	14.70 s 886	40.40 m 673	5.00 m 910	54.05 m 649	4:34.09 s 713
7	Fredriech Pretorius (RSA)	7639	11.29 s 797	7.13 m 845	11.86 m 598	1.90 m 714	49.31 s 847	14.62 s 896	40.61 m 677	4.59 m 790	58.76 m 719	4:28.33 s 756
8	David Guest (WAL)	7516	10.95 s 872	7.01 m 816	12.43 m 633	1.87 m 687	48.08 s 905	14.70 s 886	43.14 m 729	4.50 m 760	51.93 m 617	4:51.23 s 611
9	Lindon Victor (GRN)	7429	11.06 s 847	6.93 m 797	14.48 m 758	1.93 m 740	50.15 s 808	16.60 s 667	51.29 m 897	3.60 m 509	68.55 m 867	5:03.68 s 539
10	Curtis Matthews (WAL)	7422	11.03 s 854	7.20 m 862	13.53 m 700	1.84 m 661	50.94 s 772	14.88 s 864	47.85 m 826	4.30 m 702	52.09 m 620	4:59.72 s 561
11	Guillaume Thierry (MRI)	7303	11.39 s 776	6.96 m 804	13.80 m 716	1.87 m 687	52.71 s 694	15.18 s 828	41.45 m 694	4.59 m 790	62.87 m 781	5:04.76 s 533
12	Peter Glass (NIR)	7287	11.20 s 817	6.74 m 753	13.69 m 709	1.93 m 740	52.52 s 702	14.94 s 857	45.11 m 769	4.50 m 760	56.05 m 679	5:10.51 s 501
13	Martin Brockman (ENG)	7010	11.54 s 744	6.93 m 797	13.84 m 719	2.05 m 850	50.83 s 777	15.65 s 773	37.85 m 621	4.50 m 760	42.15 m 473	5:11.42 s 496
14	Jake Stein (AUS)	7005	DQ; 0	7.15 m 850	14.80 m 777	1.96 m 767	50.63 s 786	15.09 s 839	50.37 m 878	4.09 m 645	68.25 m 863	4:53.12 s 600
	Brent Newdick (NZL)	DNF	11.18 s 817	7.22 m 753	13.96 m 709	1.93 m 740	52.87 s 687	15.47 s 794	42.58 m 717	DNS		
	Atsu Nyamadi (GHA)	DNF	11.27 s 801	7.36 m 900	13.47 m 696	1.90 m 714	50.36 s 789	15.40 s 802	34.09 m 545	DNS		
	Willem Coertzen (RSA)	DNF	10.88 s 888	7.40 m 910	13.70 m 710	1.87 m 687	DNS					
	Scott McLaren (NZL)	DNF	11.59 s 734	6.29 m 644	14.35 m 750	1.78 m 610	DNS					
	Keron Stout (IVB)	DNF	11.32 s 791	DNS								
