= Fredriech Pretorius =

South African athlete (born 1995)

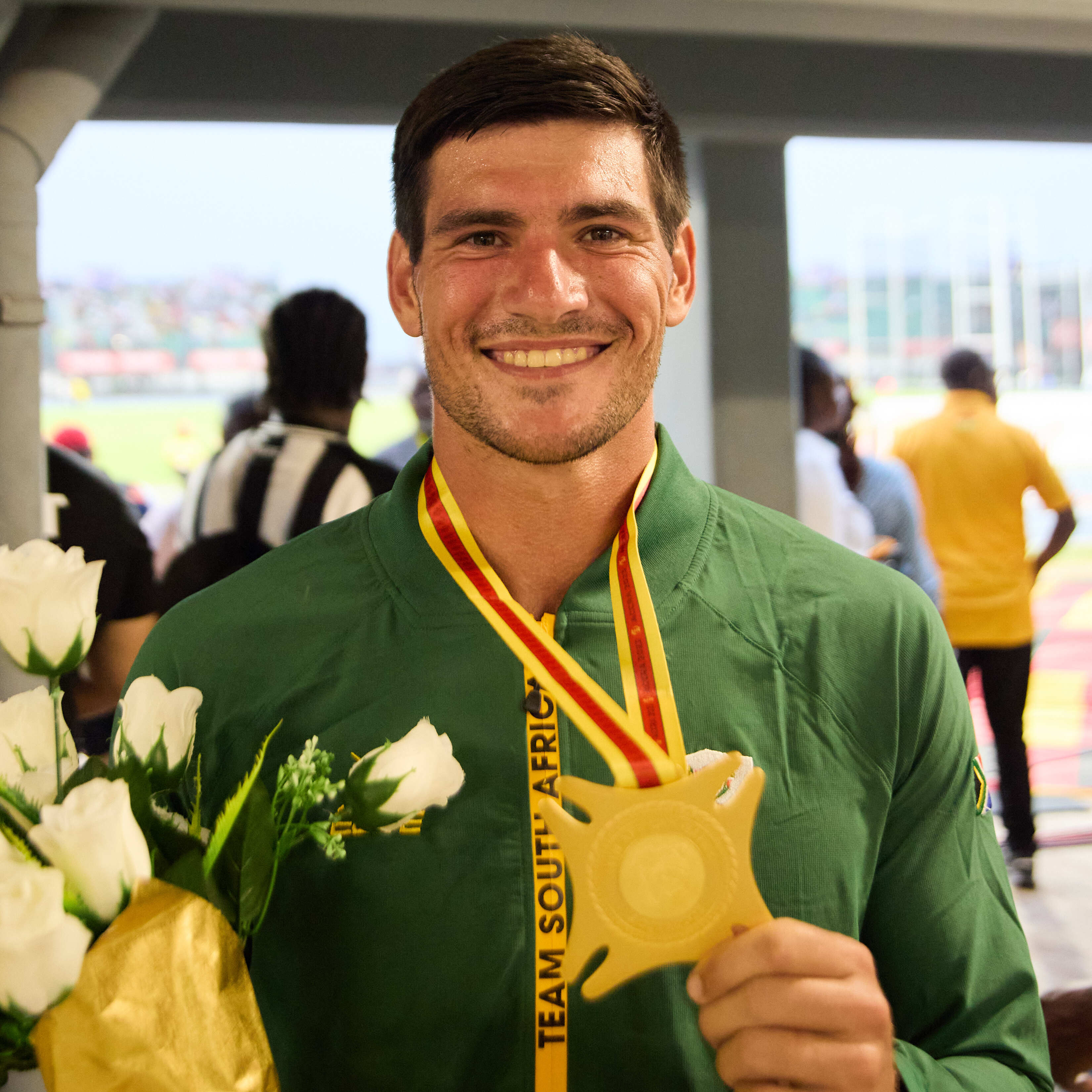
- Pretorius at the 2023 African Games

Personal information
- Nationality: South Africa
- Born: 4 August 1995 (age 30)
- Education: University of Pretoria

Sport
- Sport: Athletics
- Event: Decathlon
Medal record
Men's athletics
Representing South Africa
African Games
Gold medal – first place	2023 Accra	Decathlon
Bronze medal – third place	2015 Brazzaville	Decathlon
African Championships
Gold medal – first place	2016 Durban	Decathlon
Silver medal – second place	2018 Asaba	Decathlon
Silver medal – second place	2022 Saint Pierre	Decathlon

Fredriech Pretorius (born 4 August 1995) is a South African track and field athlete specialising in the decathlon. He was the bronze medallist at the 2015 African Games before becoming continental champion at the 2016 African Championships in Athletics.

== Competition record ==
Year	Competition	Venue	Position	Event	Notes
Representing South Africa
2014	World Junior Championships	Eugene, United States	7th	Decathlon (junior)	7689
2014	Commonwealth Games	Glasgow, United Kingdom	7th	Decathlon	7639
2015	Universiade	Gwangju, South Korea	11th	Decathlon	7174
2015	African Games	Brazzaville, Republic of the Congo	3rd	Decathlon	7186
2016	African Championships	Durban, South Africa	1st	Decathlon	7780
2017	Universiade	Taipei, Taiwan	6th	Decathlon	7390
2018	African Championships	Asaba, Nigeria	2nd	Decathlon	7733
2022	African Championships	Saint Pierre, Mauritius	2nd	Decathlon	7504
2024	African Games	Accra, Ghana	1st	Decathlon	7550
2024	African Championships	Douala, Cameroon	–	Decathlon	DNF
