= Athletics at the 2019 African Games – Men's decathlon =

The men's decathlon event at the 2019 African Games was held on 26 and 27 August in Rabat.

== Medalists ==
Gold	Silver	Bronze
Larbi Bourrada; Algeria	Mustafa Mohamed Ramadan; Egypt	Marouane Kacimi; Morocco

== Results ==
=== 100 metres ===
Wind: +0.1 m/s

Rank	Lane	Name	Nationality	Time	Points	Notes
1	4	Marouane Kacimi	Morocco	10.82	901	
2	6	Samuel Osadolor	Nigeria	10.83	899	
3	5	Mustafa Mohamed Ramadan	Egypt	11.14	830	
4	7	Larbi Bourrada	Algeria	11.18	821	

=== Long jump ===
Rank	Athlete	Nationality	#1	#2	#3	Result	Points	Notes	Total
1	Marouane Kacimi	Morocco	7.59	7.59	7.70	7.70	985		1886
2	Larbi Bourrada	Algeria	6.75	6.78	6.85	6.85	778		1599
3	Samuel Osadolor	Nigeria	6.76	6.68	6.65	6.76	757		1656
4	Mustafa Mohamed Ramadan	Egypt	6.35	6.51	6.39	6.51	700		1530

=== Shot put ===
Rank	Athlete	Nationality	#1	#2	#3	Result	Points	Notes	Total
1	Mustafa Mohamed Ramadan	Egypt	13.11	12.71	x	13.11	674		2204
2	Larbi Bourrada	Algeria	12.34	12.55	12.40	12.55	640		2239
3	Samuel Osadolor	Nigeria	10.27	11.12	11.05	11.12	553		2209
4	Marouane Kacimi	Morocco	10.63	10.47	x	10.63	524		2410

=== High jump ===
Rank	Athlete	Nationality	1.75	1.78	1.81	1.87	1.90	1.93	1.96	1.99	2.02	2.08	2.14	Result	Points	Notes	Total
1	Marouane Kacimi	Morocco	–	–	–	–	–	–	–	–	o	o	xxx	2.08	878		3288
2	Larbi Bourrada	Algeria	–	–	o	o	xo	o	o	xxx				1.96	767		3006
3	Mustafa Mohamed Ramadan	Egypt	–	–	o	o	xo	xxo	xxx					1.93	740		2944
4	Samuel Osadolor	Nigeria	xxo	xxo	xxx									1.78	610		2819

=== 400 metres ===
Rank	Lane	Name	Nationality	Time	Points	Notes	Total
1	3	Marouane Kacimi	Morocco	49.22	851		4139
2	4	Mustafa Mohamed Ramadan	Egypt	49.34	845		3789
3	5	Samuel Osadolor	Nigeria	49.94	817		3636
4	6	Larbi Bourrada	Algeria	50.66	784		3790

=== 110 metres hurdles ===
Wind: -0.3 m/s

Rank	Lane	Name	Nationality	Time	Points	Notes	Total
1	6	Samuel Osadolor	Nigeria	14.37	927		4563
2	6	Mustafa Mohamed Ramadan	Egypt	14.70	886		4675
3	5	Larbi Bourrada	Algeria	14.81	873		4663
4	7	Marouane Kacimi	Morocco	15.04	845		4984

=== Discus throw ===
Rank	Athlete	Nationality	#1	#2	#3	Result	Points	Notes	Total
1	Samuel Osadolor	Nigeria	39.83	35.27	34.84	39.83	661		5224
2	Larbi Bourrada	Algeria	35.61	37.82	x	37.82	620		5283
3	Mustafa Mohamed Ramadan	Egypt	35.08	37.15	37.31	37.31	610		5285
4	Marouane Kacimi	Morocco	29.85	32.09	x	32.09	506		5490

=== Pole vault ===
Rank	Athlete	Nationality	2.20	3.00	3.50	3.60	3.90	4.00	4.10	4.30	4.40	4.50	4.60	4.70	Result	Points	Notes	Total
1	Larbi Bourrada	Algeria	–	–	–	–	–	o	–	o	o	o	o	xxx	4.60	790		6073
2	Mustafa Mohamed Ramadan	Egypt	–	–	xxo	o	o	xo	xo	o	xxx				4.30	702		5987
	Marouane Kacimi	Morocco	xxx												NM	0		5490
	Samuel Osadolor	Nigeria	–	xxx											NM	0		5224

=== Javelin throw ===
Rank	Athlete	Nationality	#1	#2	#3	Result	Points	Notes	Total
1	Larbi Bourrada	Algeria	59.69	58.80	50.85	59.69	733		6806
2	Samuel Osadolor	Nigeria	46.20	50.31	52.94	52.94	632		5856
3	Mustafa Mohamed Ramadan	Egypt	x	45.36	50.60	50.60	597		6584
4	Marouane Kacimi	Morocco	40.82	39.63	x	40.82	454		5944

=== 1500 metres ===
Rank	Name	Nationality	Time	Points	Notes
1	Marouane Kacimi	Morocco	4:42.76	663	
2	Samuel Osadolor	Nigeria	4:50.43	616	
3	Mustafa Mohamed Ramadan	Egypt	5:07.95	515	
4	Larbi Bourrada	Algeria	5:08.32	513	

=== Final standings ===
The highest mark recorded in each event is highlighted in yellow

Rank	Athlete	Nationality	100m	LJ	SP	HJ	400m	110m H	DT	PV	JT	1500m	Points	Notes
1st place, gold medalist(s)	Larbi Bourrada	Algeria	11.18	6.85	12.55	1.96	50.66	14.81	37.82	4.60	59.69	5:08.32	7319	
2nd place, silver medalist(s)	Mustafa Mohamed Ramadan	Egypt	11.14	6.51	13.11	1.93	49.34	14.70	37.31	4.30	50.60	5:07.95	7099	
3rd place, bronze medalist(s)	Marouane Kacimi	Morocco	10.82	7.70	10.63	2.08	49.22	15.04	32.09	NM	40.82	4:42.76	6607	
4	Samuel Osadolor	Nigeria	10.83	6.76	11.12	1.78	49.94	14.37	39.83	NM	52.94	4:50.43	6472	
