= Athletics at the 2011 All-Africa Games – Men's pole vault =

The men's pole vault event at the 2011 All-Africa Games was held on 14 September. There were only two contestants, both of them Algerian decathletes.

== Results ==
Rank	Athlete	Nationality	4.00	4.50	4.70	5.00	5.10	Result	Notes
1st place, gold medalist(s)	Larbi Bouraada	Algeria	–	xo	xxo	xxo	xxx	5.00	PB
2nd place, silver medalist(s)	Mourad Souissi	Algeria	o	xxx				4.00	
