= Atsu Nyamadi =

Ghanaian decathlete

Personal information
- Nationality: (Ghana) Ghanaian
- Born: 1 June 1994 (age 32) Anloga, Ghana
- Education: Middle Tennessee State University
- Height: 1.87 m (6 ft 2 in)
- Weight: 81 kg (179 lb)

Sport
- Sport: Track and field
- Event: Decathlon
- College team: Middle Tennessee Blue Raiders
Medal record
Men's athletics
Representing Ghana
African Games
Silver medal – second place	2015 Brazzaville	Decathlon
African Championships
Silver medal – second place	2016 Durban	Decathlon
Bronze medal – third place	2014 Marrakesh	Decathlon

Atsu Nyamadi (born 1 June 1994) is a Ghanaian athlete competing in the decathlon. He won medals at the 2014 African Championships and 2015 African Games.

His personal best in the event is 7811 points set in Charlottesville, United States in April 2017. This is also the current national record.

== Competition record ==
Year	Competition	Venue	Position	Event	Notes
Representing Ghana
2010	Youth Olympic Games	Singapore	8th	Triple jump	14.51 m
2012	African Championships	Porto-Novo, Benin	5th	Decathlon	5932 pts
2014	Commonwealth Games	Glasgow, United Kingdom	–	Decathlon	DNF
2014	African Championships	Marrakesh, Morocco	3rd	Decathlon	6946 pts
2015	African Games	Brazzaville, Republic of the Congo	2nd	Decathlon	7478 pts
2016	African Championships	Durban, South Africa	2nd	Decathlon	7501 pts
2018	Commonwealth Games	Gold Coast, Australia	–	Decathlon	DNF

== Personal bests ==
Outdoor

- 100 metres – 11.12 (+1.3 m/s) (Eugene 2016)
- 400 metres – 49.76 (Murfreesboro 2016)
- 1500 metres – 3:56.33 (Porto Novo 2012)
- 110 metres hurdles – 14.61 (+2.0 m/s) (Auburn 2016)
- High jump – 2.01 (Murfreesboro 2016)
- Pole vault – 4.40 (Charlottesville 2017)
- Long jump – 7.62 (+1.7 m/s) (Charlottesville 2017)
- Triple jump – 15.14 (Kumasi 2011)
- Shot put – 14.49 (Gold Coast 2018)
- Discus throw – 46.61 (Gold Coast 2018)
- Javelin throw – 66.96 (Eugene 2016)
- Decathlon – 7811 (Charlottesville 2017)

Indoor

- 60 metres – 7.10 (Birmingham 2016)
- 1000 metres – 2:45.93 (Birmingham 2016)
- 60 metres hurdles – 8.22 (Birmingham 2018)
- High jump – 2.01 (Nashville 2015)
- Pole vault – 4.29 (Birmingham 2017)
- Long jump – 7.57 (Nashville 2016)
- Triple jump – 15.04 (Murfreesboro 2014)
- Shot put – 14.50 (Birmingham 2018)
- Heptathlon – 5505 (Birmingham 2017)
