= 2006 African Championships in Athletics – Men's pole vault =

The men's pole vault event at the 2006 African Championships in Athletics was held at the Stade Germain Comarmond on August 12.

== Results ==
Rank	Name	Nationality	4.20	4.40	4.60	4.70	4.80	4.90	5.00	5.05	5.15	5.20	5.50	Result	Notes
1st place, gold medalist(s)	Okkert Brits	South Africa	–	–	–	–	–	–	–	–	–	xo	xxx	5.20	
2nd place, silver medalist(s)	Abderamane Tamada	Tunisia	–	–	–	o	–	xo	xo	–	xo	xxx		5.15	
3rd place, bronze medalist(s)	Hamdi Dhouibi	Tunisia	–	–	–	–	o	–	xxx					4.80	
3rd place, bronze medalist(s)	Karim Sène	Senegal	–	–	–	–	o	–	x–	xx				4.80	
5	Guillaume Thierry	Mauritius	o	xxx										4.20	
	Karim El Mafhoum	Morocco	–	–	xxx									NM	
