= 2002 African Championships in Athletics – Men's decathlon =

The men's decathlon event at the 2002 African Championships in Athletics was held in Radès, Tunisia on August 8–9.

== Results ==
The highest mark recorded in each event is highlighted in yellow

Rank	Athlete	Nationality	100m	LJ	SP	HJ	400m	110m H	DT	PV	JT	1500m	Points	Notes
1st place, gold medalist(s)	Hamdi Dhouibi	Tunisia	10.74	7.29	12.58	1.97	48.48	14.48	43.96	4.80	55.12	4:38.98	7965	AR
2nd place, silver medalist(s)	Anis Riahi	Tunisia	10.93	7.08	11.32	1.82	48.30	15.39	41.30	4.20	57.17	4:38.77	7363	
3rd place, bronze medalist(s)	Rédouane Youcef	Algeria	10.76	7.22	10.69	1.79	49.43	15.96	39.25	4.20	50.57	4:42.39	7089	
4	Maba Ndiaye	Senegal	10.87	7.10	12.25	2.03	51.11	14.70	32.92	3.60	45.59	5:00.15	6945	
5	Imad Faraj	Libya	11.33	6.52	10.33	1.82	52.91	16.35	31.50	3.60	38.66	5:02.39	5991	
	Mohamed Benhadia	Algeria	10.86	6.76	12.24	1.79	DNF	DQ	32.74	DNS	–	–	DNF	
	Jomaa Sherteel	Libya	12.20	5.61	11.52	DNS	–	–	–	–	–	–	DNF	
	Selwyn Lieutier	Mauritius	DNF	DNS	–	–	–	–	–	–	–	–	DNF	
	Mustapha Taha Husein	Egypt	DQ	DNS	–	–	–	–	–	–	–	–	DNF	
