= Hamdi Dhouibi =

Tunisian decathlete (born 1982)

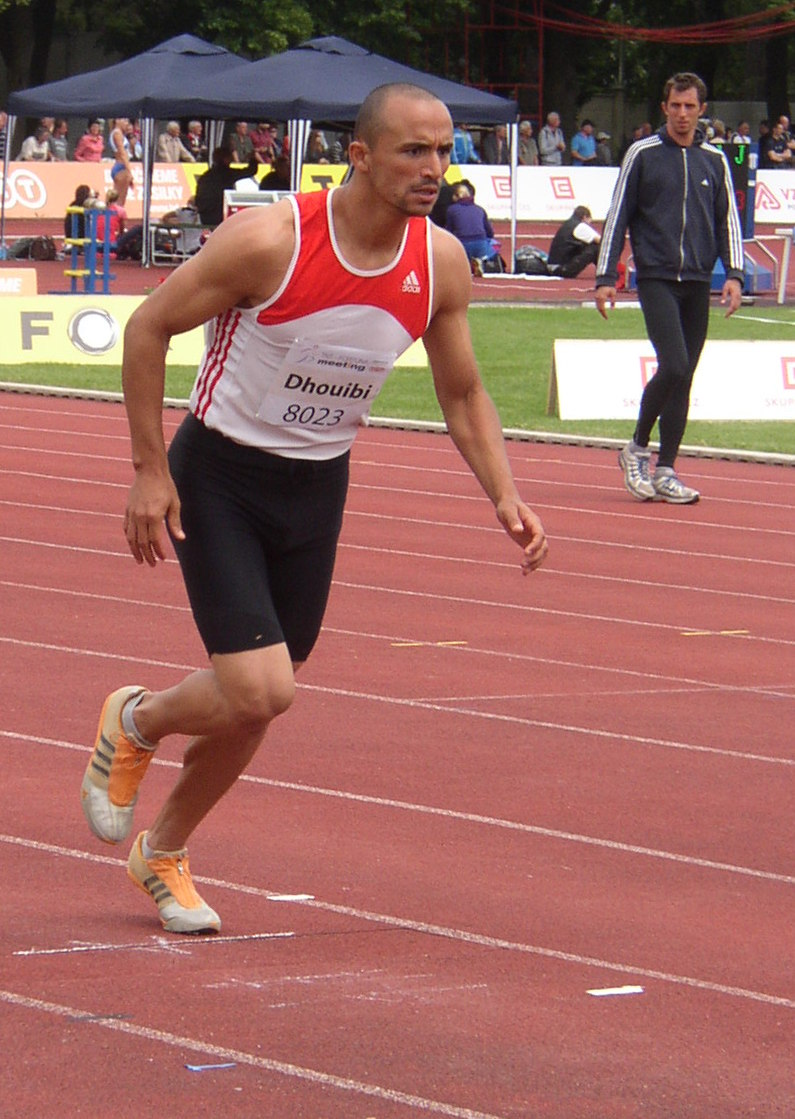
- Hamdi Dhouibi at the 2010 TNT - Fortuna Meeting in Kladno

Personal information
- Nationality: Tunisia
- Born: January 24, 1982 (age 44) Kairouan, Tunisia

Sport
- Sport: Decathlon
Medal record
Men's athletics
Representing Tunisia
All-Africa Games
Gold medal – first place	2007 Algiers	Pole vault
Gold medal – first place	2007 Algiers	Decathlon
African Championships
Gold medal – first place	2002 Radès	Decathlon
Gold medal – first place	2006 Bambous	Decathlon
Gold medal – first place	2010 Nairobi	Pole vault
Bronze medal – third place	2006 Bambous	Pole vault
- Updated on 27 March 2013

Hamdi Dhouibi (born 24 January 1982 in Kairouan) is a Tunisian decathlete.

He held the African record with 8023 points, achieved at the 2005 World Championships in Helsinki. The record was broken by Larbi Bouraada of Algeria at the 2009 World Championships. Dhouibi also holds the African record in heptathlon (indoor) with 5733 points, achieved in March 2003 in Aubière.

== International competitions ==
Year	Competition	Venue	Position	Event	Notes
2001	African Junior Championships	Réduit, Mauritius	1st	Pole vault	4.60 m
2001	African Junior Championships	Réduit, Mauritius	3rd	Long jump	7.18 m
2001	Jeux de la Francophonie	Ottawa, Canada	2nd	Decathlon	7548 pts (PB)
2001	Mediterranean Games	Radès, Tunisia	7th	4 × 400 m relay	3:13.23 min
2001	Mediterranean Games	Radès, Tunisia	2nd	Decathlon	7530 pts
2002	African Championships	Radès, Tunisia	1st	Decathlon	7965 pts (CR, PB)
2003	World Championships	Paris, France	–	Decathlon	DNF
2004	Pan Arab Games	Algiers, Algeria	1st	Decathlon	7595 pts (CR)
2005	Mediterranean Games	Almería, Spain	3rd	Decathlon	7847 pts
2005	World Championships	Helsinki, Finland	11th	Decathlon	8023 pts (AR)
2006	African Championships	Radès, Tunisia	3rd	Pole vault	4.80 m
2006	African Championships	Radès, Tunisia	1st	Decathlon	7566 pts
2007	Hypo-Meeting	Götzis, Austria	–	Decathlon	DNF
2007	All-Africa Games	Algiers, Algeria	3rd	Pole vault	4.90 m
2007	All-Africa Games	Algiers, Algeria	1st	Decathlon	7838 pts (CR)
2010	African Championships	Nairobi, Kenya	1st	Pole vault	4.70 m
2010	African Championships	Nairobi, Kenya	–	Decathlon	DNF
2011	Pan Arab Games	Doha, Qatar	4th	Pole vault	4.70 m
2011	Pan Arab Games	Doha, Qatar	2nd	Decathlon	7664 pts

=== Personal bests ===
- 100 metres – 10.74 (Radés 2002)
- 400 metres – 47.04 (Helsinki 2005)
- 1500 metres – 4:21.15 (Almería 2005)
- 110 metres hurdles – 14.12 (Tunis 2003)
- High jump – 1.99 m (Almería 2005)
- Pole vault – 5.00 m (Wien 2002)
- Long jump – 7.49 m (Gent 2002)
- Shot put – 13.91 m (Desenzano del Garda 2003)
- Discus throw – 43.96 m (Radés 2002)
- Javelin throw – 55.12 m (Radés 2002)
- Decathlon – 8023 pts (Helsinki 2005)
