= 2004 African Championships in Athletics – Men's pole vault =

The men's pole vault event at the 2004 African Championships in Athletics was held in Brazzaville, Republic of the Congo on July 14.

== Results ==
Rank	Name	Nationality	Result	Notes
1st place, gold medalist(s)	Béchir Zaghouani	Tunisia	5.20	
2nd place, silver medalist(s)	Karim Sène	Senegal	5.00	
3rd place, bronze medalist(s)	Mohamed Karbib	Morocco	4.60	
