= Anis Riahi =

Tunisian decathlete (born 1971)

Medal record

Men's athletics

Representing Tunisia

All-Africa Games
| Silver medal – second place | 1995 Harare | Decathlon |
| Gold medal – first place | 1999 Johannesburg | Decathlon |

African Championships
| Gold medal – first place | 1996 Yaoundé | Pole vault |
| Gold medal – first place | 1996 Yaoundé | Decathlon |
| Gold medal – first place | 2004 Brazzaville | Decathlon |
| Silver medal – second place | 2002 Radès | Decathlon |

Anis Riahi (born 30 May 1971) is a retired Tunisian decathlete.

Riahi won the gold medal in pole vault at the 1996 African Championships. In decathlon he won gold medals at the 1996 African Championships, the 1999 All-Africa Games and 2004 African Championships, the silver medals at the 1995 All-Africa Games and the 2002 African Championships, and a bronze medal at the 1997 Jeux de la Francophonie. He also won the decathlon at the 1997 and 1999 Pan Arab Games. He became Tunisian champion in different events six times, and two in the decathlon.

His personal best score is 7642 points, achieved in July 2000 in Talence.
