= Larbi Bourrada =

Algerian decathlete (born 1988)

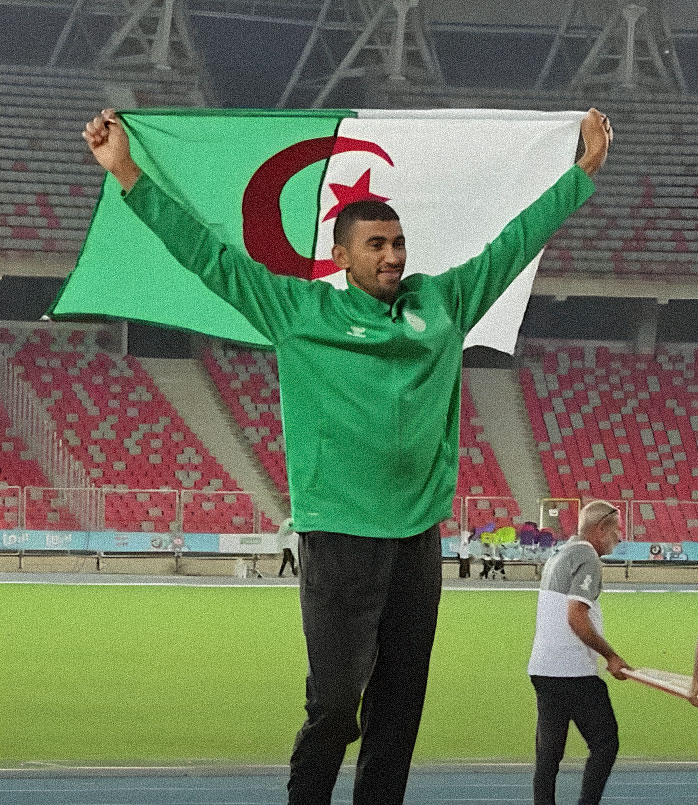
- Larbi Bourrada at the 2023 Arab Games

Personal information
- Born: May 10, 1988 (age 38) Rouiba, Algeria
- Height: 1.88 m (6 ft 2 in)
- Weight: 88 kg (194 lb)

Sport
- Country: Algeria
- Sport: Athletics
- Event: Decathlon
Medal record
Men's athletics
Representing Algeria
All-Africa Games
Gold medal – first place	2011 Maputo	Pole vault
Gold medal – first place	2019 Rabat	Decathlon
Bronze medal – third place	2007 Algiers	Decathlon
Bronze medal – third place	2019 Rabat	Pole vault
African Championships
Gold medal – first place	2008 Addis Ababa	Decathlon
Gold medal – first place	2010 Nairobi	Decathlon
Gold medal – first place	2014 Marrakesh	Decathlon
Gold medal – first place	2018 Asaba	Decathlon
Gold medal – first place	2022 Saint Pierre	Decathlon
Gold medal – first place	2024 Douala	Decathlon
Silver medal – second place	2008 Addis Ababa	Pole vault
Silver medal – second place	2010 Nairobi	Pole vault

Larbi Bourrada (called sometimes Larbi Bouraâda or Larbi Bouraada; Arabic: العربي بورعدة; born May 10, 1988) is an Algerian decathlon athlete. He is a six-time African champion in decathlon (2008, 2010, 2014, 2018, 2022, 2024) and the African record holder in the event. He has also competed in the pole vault, winning the All-Africa Games title in 2011 and two silver medals at the African Championships. In 2012 his doping sample at a competition came back positive for the banned steroid Stanozolol, and he was given a two-year ban from athletics.

== Biography ==
As a teenager he won the bronze medal in the decathlon at the 2007 All-Africa Games.

In 2009 he surpassed the 8000 point mark for the first time at a competition in Algeria and qualified for the World Championships in Berlin in the decathlon, where he set a new African record with 8171 points .

At the 2009 World Championships in Athletics held in Berlin, he set a new African record with 8171 points and finished twelfth. He also finished second at the pole vault at the 2010 African Championships in Athletics with a height of 4.60 m behind Hamdi Dhouibi from Tunisia. He was Africa's representative at the 2010 IAAF Continental Cup in the high jump, pole vault and the long jump. He also set an Algerian record for the indoor heptathlon that year, scoring 5911 points as a guest athlete at the French Championships.

In July 2011 he set a new African record with a total of 8302 points at the Ratingen Combined Event meeting in Germany. He set three personal records in the competition: 100 m (10.61 s), long jump (7.94 m) and discus throw (40.34 m). He finished tenth at the 2011 Athletics World Championships in Daegu with a total of 8158 points, including two personal bests: 13.56 s in the 110 m hurdles and 4.90 m in the pole vault. He was eliminated from the decathlon in the 2011 All-Africa Games in Maputo after two false starts at the first event (100 m). The games were held two weeks after the world championships and he said that this was not enough time to recover. He entered the individual pole vault event, however, and won with a personal best of 5.00 m.

Returning to the Ratingen meeting in 2012, he again won the competition with an African record score. He set bests in the 100 metres, shot put and javelin throw to lead from start to finish and collect 8332 points. However, his doping sample at the competition came back positive for the banned steroid Stanozolol. Bourrada was disqualified from the event and given a two-year ban from athletics.

Bourrada returned to competition during the 2014 season, winning his third African title in Marrakesh with a personal best and championship record score of 8311 points.

== Personal bests ==
Event	Performance	Place	Date
100 m	10.58	Ratingen	14 June 2012
Long jump	7.94 m	Ratingen	16 July 2011
Shot put	13.78 m	Rio de Janeiro	17 August 2016
High jump	2.10 m	Rio de Janeiro	17 August 2016
400 metres	46.69	Alger	11 June 2009
110 m hurdles	14.13	Alger	15 July 2016
Discus throw	42.39 m	Rio de Janeiro	18 August 2016
Pole vault	5.00 m	Maputo	14 September 2011
Javelin throw	67.68 m	Ratingen	15 June 2012
1500 metres	4:12.15	Berlin	20 August 2009
Decathlon	8521	Rio de Janeiro	18 August 2016

Records
Preceded by (Tunisia) Hamdi Dhouibi (South Africa) Willem Coertzen	Men's Decathlon African Record Holder; August 20, 2009 – August 11, 2013; August 29, 2015 – present	Succeeded by Incumbent
