= Willem Coertzen =

South African track and field athlete

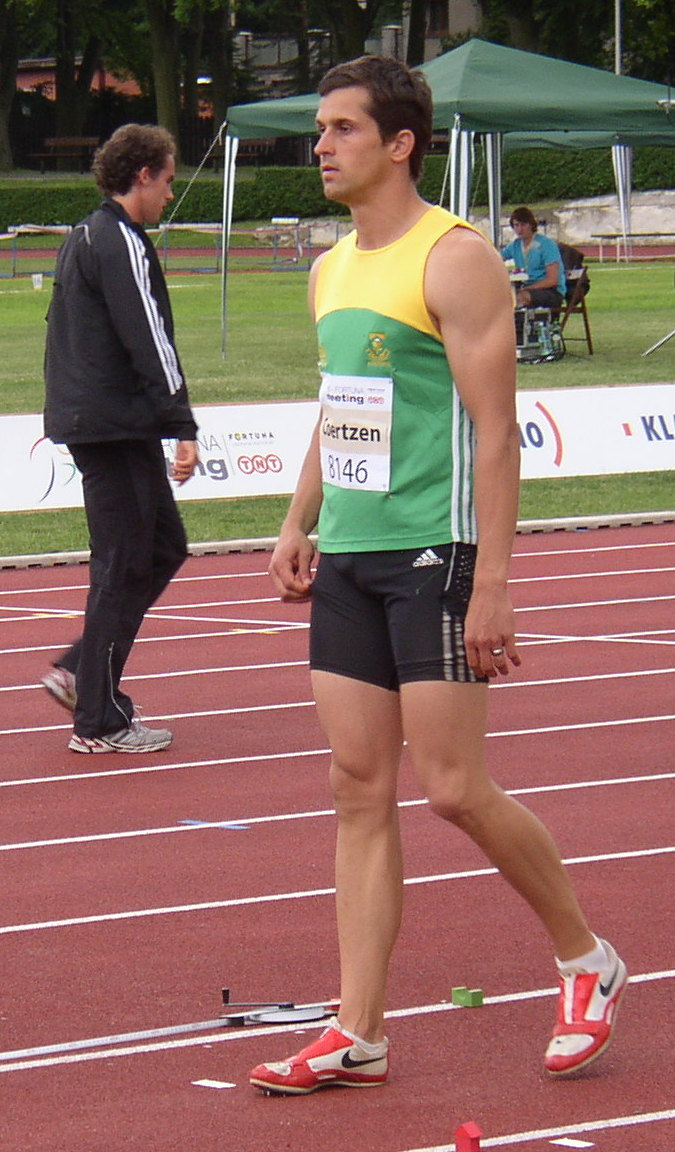

Personal information
- Born: 30 December 1982 (age 43)
- Height: 1.86 m (6 ft 1 in)
- Weight: 79 kg (174 lb)

Sport
- Country: South Africa
- Sport: Athletics
- Event: Decathlon
Medal record
Men's athletics
Representing South Africa
African Championships
Silver medal – second place	2008 Addis Ababa	Decathlon
Bronze medal – third place	2008 Addis Ababa	Pole vault

Willem Coertzen (born 30 December 1982, in Nigel) is a retired South African track and field athlete who competed in the decathlon. He was the silver medallist in the event at the African Championships in Athletics in 2008. He is the current South African national record holder in the event with his score of 8343.

== Athletics career ==
He began taking part in decathlon competitions in 2007 for Shaftesbury Barnet Harriers in the United Kingdom, where he won the South of England Combined Events Championship in Bedford with a total of 7245 points. The following year he returned to his native South Africa to win his first national decathlon title, then recorded a personal best of 7721 points in Réduit. A month later at the 2008 African Championships in Athletics in Addis Ababa, he took the silver medal in the decathlon behind Algeria's Larbi Bouraada and also managed a bronze medal in the pole vault event with a modest clearance of 4.00 m. He underwent a groin operation in November that year, leading him to miss the following year's national championships.

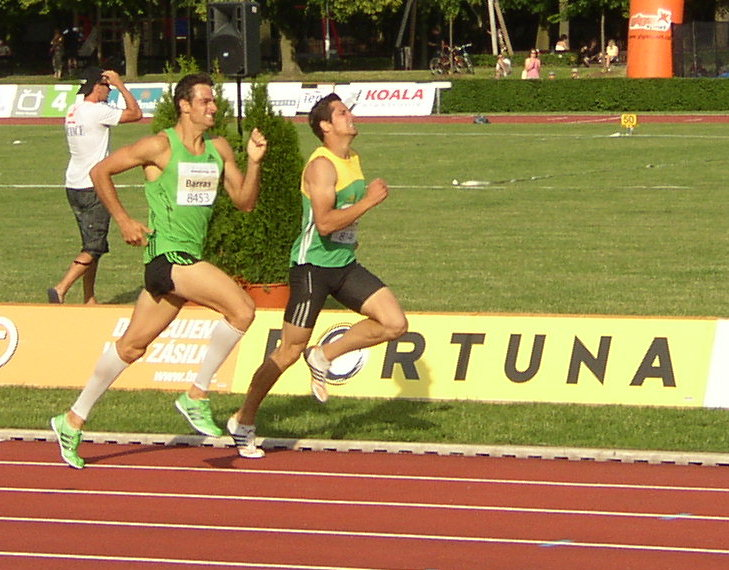
Willem Coertzen (right) and Romain Barras in finish of 1500m run at the 2011 TNT – Fortuna Meeting in Kladno

The following May he completed two decathlons: he set a new South African record in the event with a score of 7907 points for third place at the Multistars meeting in Desenzano del Garda. Although he was eleventh at the 2009 Hypo-Meeting in Götzis later that month, he improved his record further with a total of 8054 points, clearing the 8000-point mark for the first time in his career. He was selected to represent his country at the 2009 World Championships in Athletics and he significantly improved upon his past marks. Reflecting upon his performance of 8146 points in the men's decathlon in Berlin, he said: "Six personal bests out of 10 events, 14th in the world, and a new national record - who could be unhappy with that?". One of these personal bests was in the pole vault, which he achieved after an incident where his pole snapped in three places during a jump.

He competed sparingly in 2010, but returned to international competition the following year. He edged out Olympic medallist Dmitriy Karpov at the TNT - Fortuna Meeting in June 2011, taking third place with a score of 8094 points (which included personal bests in the discus throw, shot put and 1500 metres). He improved his national record to 8244 points at the 2012 South African Championships, setting bests in the pole vault, 1500 m, and javelin throw.

He came a close second to Damian Warner at the 2013 Decastar meeting, finishing with 8118 points (including a 2.08 m personal best in the high jump).

At the 2014 Commonwealth Games, he competed in the decathlon, where he competed in the first four events before pulling out before the start of the 400 metres.

== Statistics ==
=== Personal bests ===
Event	Result	Venue	Competition	Date
60 metres	7.17	Lee Valley	South of England Open Pentathlon	6 January 2008
100 metres	10.88	Hampden Park	Commonwealth Games	28 July 2014
400 metres	48.56	Olympic Park	Olympic Games	8 August 2012
1000 metres	2:53.04	Sheffield	English Combined Events Championships	13 January 2008
1500 metres	4:23.75	Port Elizabeth	South African Championships	14 April 2012
60 metres hurdles	8.34	Lee Valley	South of England Open Pentathlon	6 January 2008
110 metres hurdles	14.15	Olympic Park	Olympic Games	9 August 2012
High jump	2.05	Réduit	Réduit Decathlon	5 April 2008
Pole vault	4.63	Port Elizabeth	South African Championships	14 April 2012
Long jump	7.47	Port Elizabeth	South African Championships	13 April 2012
Shot put	14.08	Kladno	IAAF Combined Events Challenge	15 June 2011
Discus throw	44.14	Woodford Green	Woodford Green Open	17 July 2012
Javelin throw	66.95	Port Elizabeth	South African Championships	14 April 2012
Indoor pentathlon	3709	Lee Valley	South of England Open Pentathlon	6 January 2008
Indoor heptathlon	4862	Sheffield	English Combined Events Championships	13 January 2008
Decathlon	8244	Port Elizabeth	South African Championships	13-14 April 2012

Records
Preceded by (Algeria) Larbi Bouraada	Men's Decathlon African Record Holder; 11 August 2013 – 29 August 2015	Succeeded by (Algeria) Larbi Bouraada
