= Rédouane Youcef =

Algerian decathlete (born 1974)

Medal record

Men's athletics

Representing Algeria

All-Africa Games
| Silver medal – second place | 1999 Johannesburg | Decathlon |
| Bronze medal – third place | 2003 Abuja | Decathlon |

African Championships
| Gold medal – first place | 1998 Dakar | Decathlon |
| Gold medal – first place | 2000 Algiers | Decathlon |
| Bronze medal – third place | 2002 Radès | Decathlon |

Islamic Solidarity Games
| Bronze medal – third place | 1998 Mecca | Decathlon |

Rédouane Youcef (born 29 January 1974) is a retired Algerian decathlete.

He won gold medals at the 1998 and 2000 African Championships, and a bronze medal at the 2002 African Championships. He won the silver medal at the 1999 All-Africa Games and the bronze medal at the 2003 All-Africa Games. He became Algerian champion five times in hurdles and long jump, and several times in the decathlon.
