= Guillaume Thierry =

Mauritian athlete

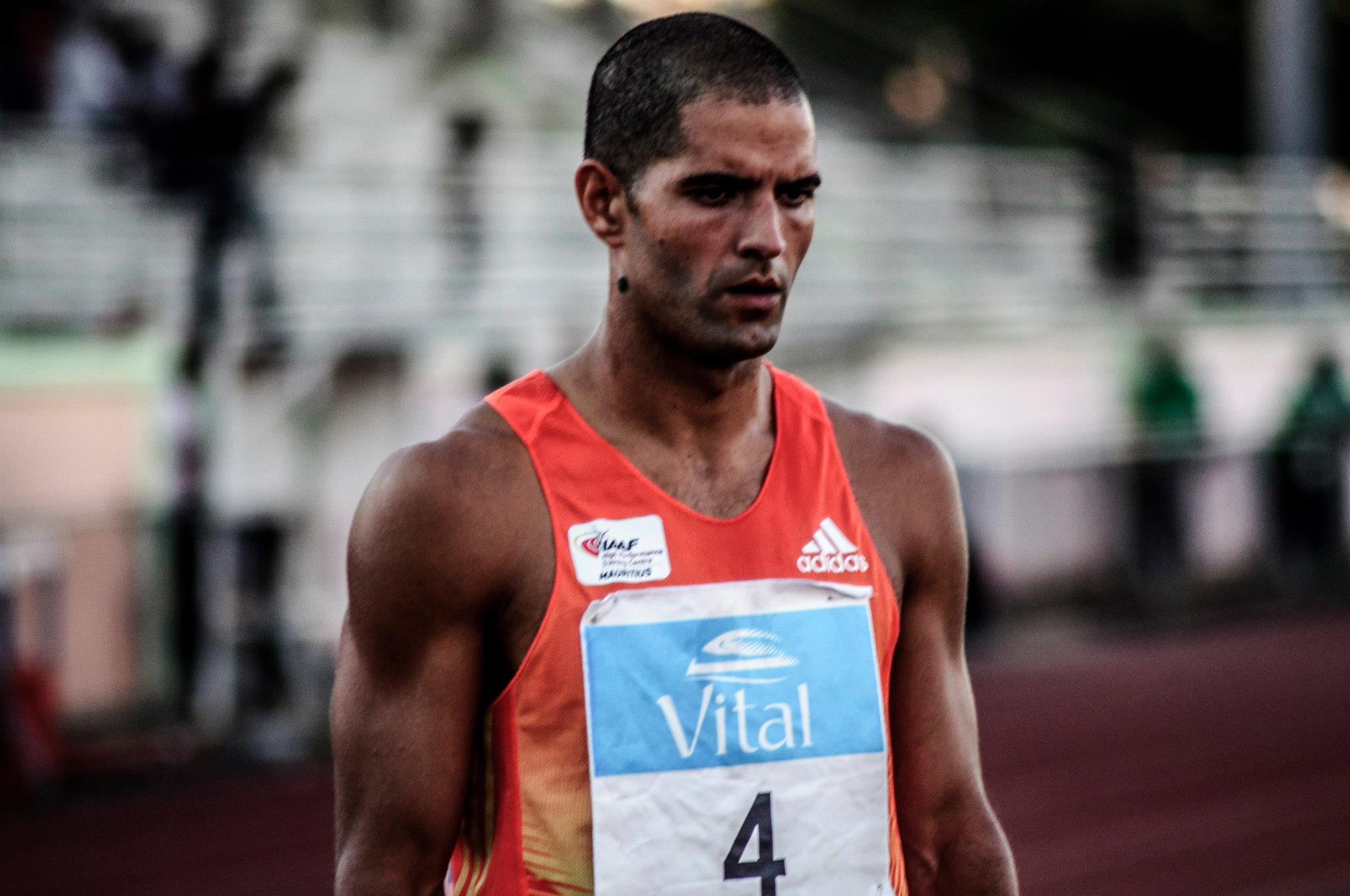
- 400m Start for International Meet 2013

Personal information
- Nationality: Mauritius
- Born: 15 September 1986 (age 39)

Sport
- Sport: Athletics
- Event: Decathlon
Medal record
Men's athletics
Representing Mauritius
African Games
Gold medal – first place	2015 Brazzaville	Decathlon
Silver medal – second place	2011 Maputo	Decathlon
African Championships
Silver medal – second place	2014 Marrakesh	Decathlon
Bronze medal – third place	2010 Nairobi	Decathlon
Bronze medal – third place	2012 Porto-Novo	Decathlon
- Updated on 26 August 2016

Guillaume Thierry (born 15 September 1986) is a Mauritian track and field athlete. He first represented his country at pole vault in which he competed at the 2003 World Youth Championships in Athletics held in Sherbrooke, Canada. He now competes in the decathlon and holds the Mauritian national record set on 11–12 September 2013 in Nice, France at the VII Francophone Games. He is the first Mauritian ever to score more than 7000 points in this event.

== Private life ==
Patrick Guillaume Lloyd Thierry was born in Moka, La Clinique Mauricienne. He went to college at St Andrews School and then attended the University of Mauritius where he completed a Degree in Management in August 2008 and a Master in Human Resource Studies in November 2010. He also completed computer studies at ICL (Innovative and Creative Learning Ltd.) on Computer Repairs and Maintenance and Networking. He married Anna-Louisa Leveque on 15 December 2012. Their daughter Colleen was born on 17 May 2013.

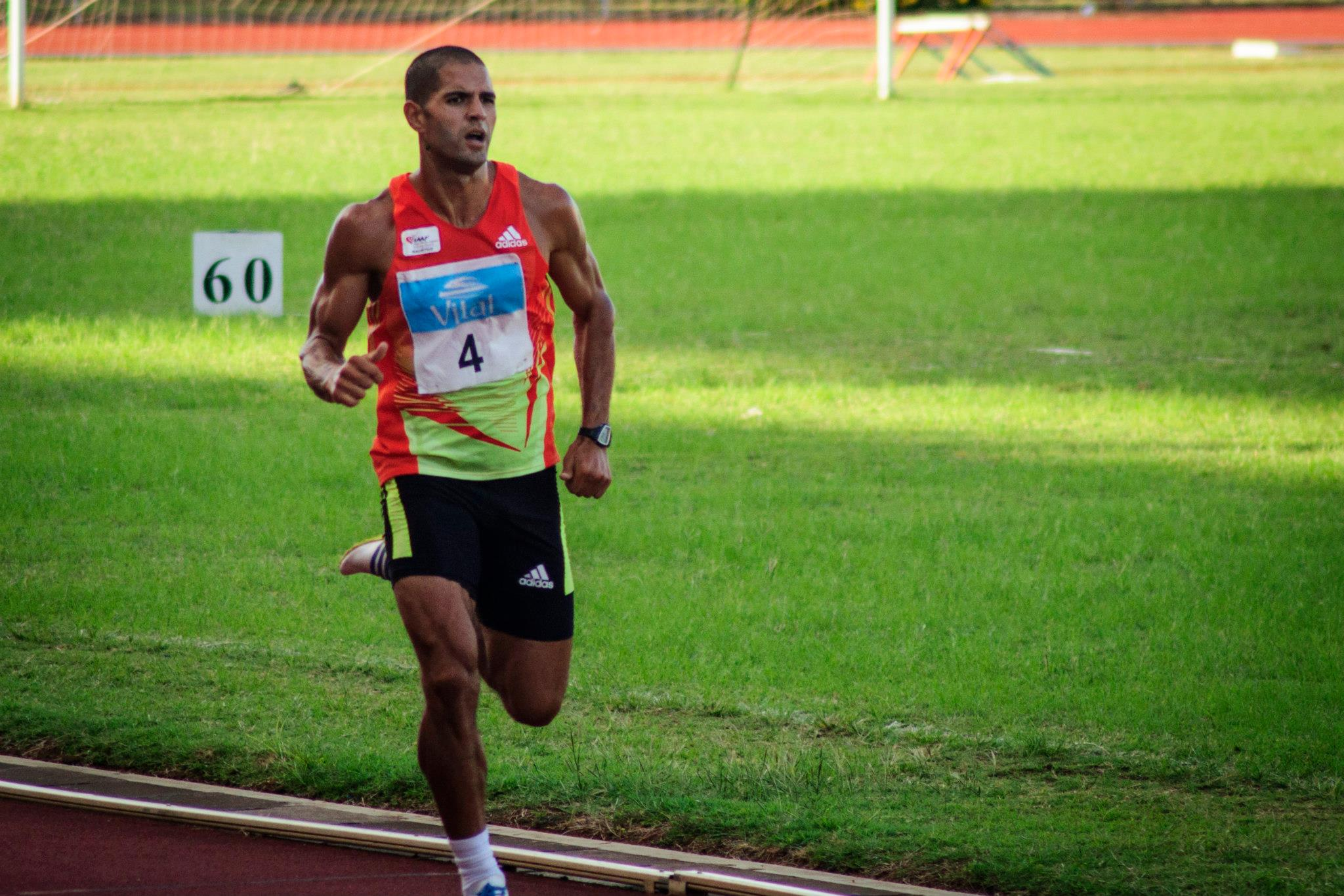
Finishing the 1500m for the International Meet 2013

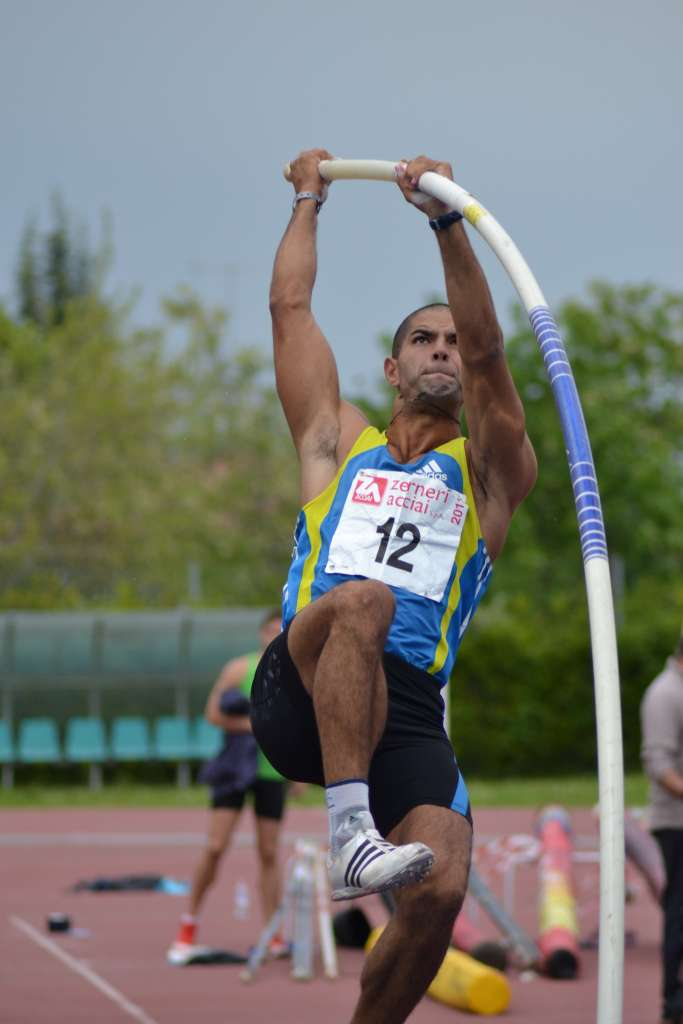
Pole Vaulting

== Sporting career ==
Thierry's was first coached by Jean Chelin and then by Jacque Dudal. When Dudal had medical issues and left Mauritius for further medication Thierry trained alone for a while and then spent three weeks in South Africa with Bob Cervenka. During this time he finished 13th, with a new National Record of 4.70m, at the World Youth Championships. He was potted by decathlon coach Aleksandr Nevskiy and changed to this event after finishing his Higher School Certificate.

=== Personal bests ===
All events referenced from All-Athletics.com.

Event	Performance	Note	Place	Date
100 metres	11.22; 11.17	Wind 1.3 m/s +7.1 m/s	Maputo, Mozambique; Arles, France	11 September 2011; 2 June 2007
400 metres	50.94		Madagascar	2007
1,500 metres	4:45.61		Nice, France	13 September 2013
110 metres hurdles	14.89		Mauritius	2011
High jump	1.92		Bambous, Mauritius	April 2014
Pole vault	5.00		Madagascar	2007
Long jump	7.25	Wind 1.9 m/s	Mauritius	10 April 2010
Shot put	15.25		Mauritius	16 April 2011
Discus throw	47.68		Maputo	12 September 2011
Javelin throw	66,39		France	May 2014
Decathlon	7537	National record	Bambous, Mauritius	April 2014

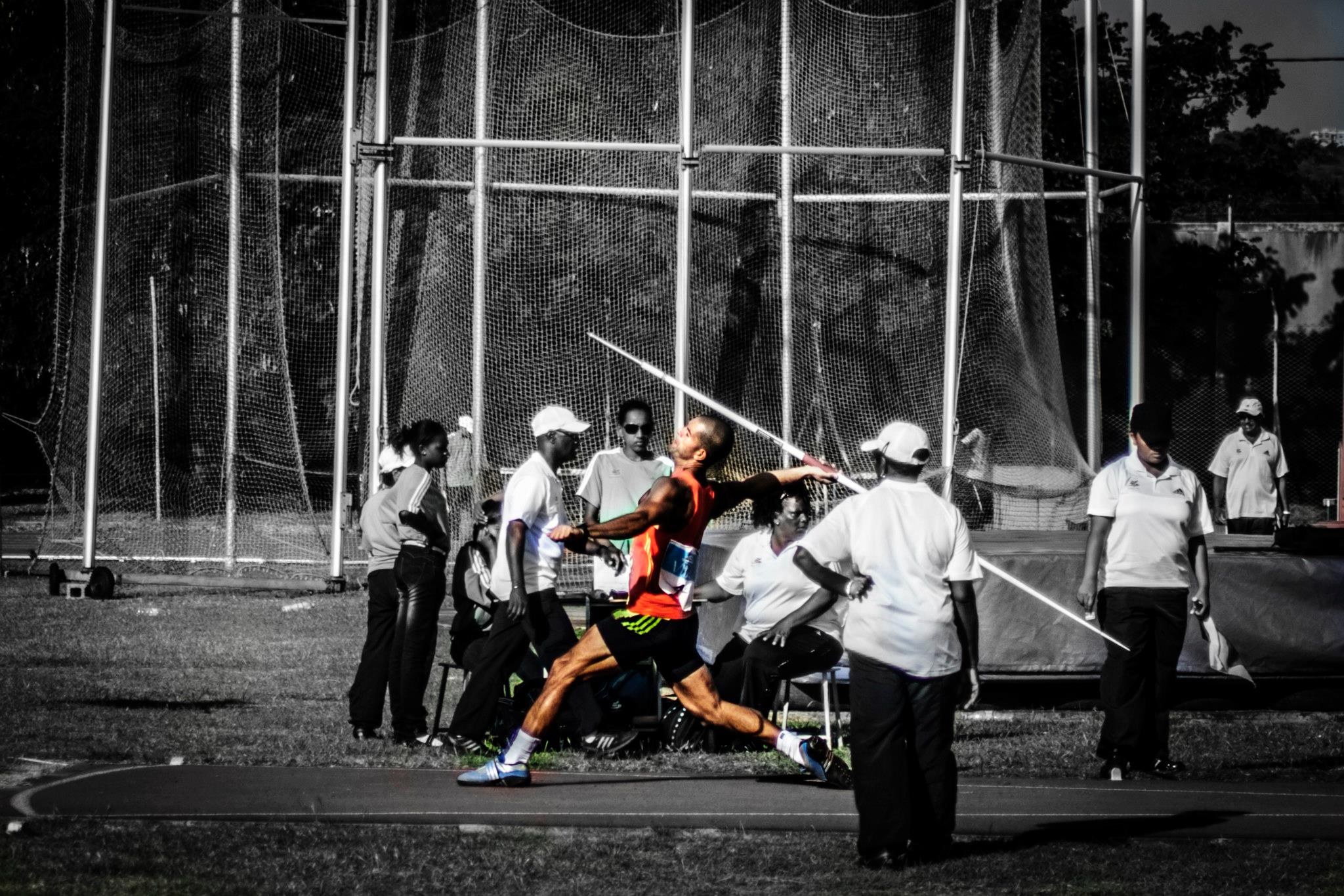
Javelin Throw - International Meet 2013

=== International results ===
Year	Competition	Venue	Position	Event	Notes
2003	World Youth Championships	Sherbrooke, Canada	13th	Pole vault	4.70m
2005	African Combined Events Championships	Tunis, Tunisia	1st	Decathlon (junior)	6697
2005	African Junior Championships	Radès, Tunisia	1st	Decathlon	6838
2006	Commonwealth Games	Melbourne, Australia	8th	Decathlon	6746
2006	African Championships	Bambous, Mauritius	5th	Pole vault	4.20 m
2006	African Championships	Bambous, Mauritius	6th	Decathlon	6602
2007	Mauritian Championships	Moka-Réduit, Mauritius	1st	Decathlon	7192
2007	All-Africa Games	Algiers, Algeria	5th	Decathlon	7186
2007	Indian Ocean Island Games	Antananarivo, Madagascar	1st	Decathlon	7283
2008	African Championships	Addis Ababa, Ethiopia	DNF	Decathlon	–
2010	African Combined Events Championships	Moka-Réduit, Mauritius	3rd	Decathlon	7179
2010	African Championships	Nairobi, Kenya	3rd	Decathlon	7100
2010	African Championships	Nairobi, Kenya	5th	Pole vault	4.20 m
2010	Commonwealth Games	New Delhi, India	9th	Decathlon	6875
2011	African Combined Events Championships	Moka-Réduit, Mauritius	2nd	Decathlon	7444
2011	Indian Ocean Games	Victoria, Seychelles	2nd	Decathlon	7456
2011	All Africa Games	Maputo, Mozambique	2nd	Decathlon	7481
2012	African Combined Events Championships	Moka-Réduit, Mauritius	2nd	Decathlon	7356
2012	African Championships	Porto-Novo, Benin	3rd	Decathlon	6995
2013	African Combined Events Championships	Moka-Réduit, Mauritius	1st	Decathlon	7049
2013	Francophone Games	Nice, France	3rd	Decathlon	7511
2014	African Combined Events Championships	Bambous, Mauritius	2nd	Decathlon	7537
2014	Commonwealth Games	Glasgow, United Kingdom	11th	Decathlon	7303
2014	African Championships	Marrakesh, Morocco	2nd	Decathlon	7312
