= 2024 African Championships in Athletics – Men's shot put =

Men's shot put at the 2024 African Championships in Athletics
- Venue: Japoma Stadium
- Location: Douala, Cameroon
- Dates: 21 June
- Competitors: 10 from 6 nations
- Winning distance: 21.22 m

Medalists
| gold medal | Chukwuebuka Enekwechi | Nigeria |
| silver medal | Mostafa Amr Hassan | Egypt |
| bronze medal | Mohamed Khalifa | Egypt |

The men's shot put event at the 2024 African Championships in Athletics was held on 21 June in Douala, Cameroon.

== Records ==
Records before the 2024 African Athletics Championships
| Record | Athlete (nation) | Distance (m) | Location | Date |
|---|---|---|---|---|
| World record | Ryan Crouser (USA) | 23.56 | Los Angeles, United States | 27 May 2023 |
| African record | Janus Robberts (RSA) | 21.97 | Eugene, United States | 2 June 2001 |
| Championship record | Janus Robberts (NGR) | 21.20 | Saint Pierre, Mauritius | 12 June 2022 |
| World leading | Joe Kovacs (USA) | 23.13 | Eugene, United States | 25 May 2024 |
| African leading | Chukwuebuka Enekwechi (NGR) | 21.91 | Eugene, United States | 25 May 2024 |

== Results ==
| Rank | Athlete | Nationality | #1 | #2 | #3 | #4 | #5 | #6 | Result | Notes |
|---|---|---|---|---|---|---|---|---|---|---|
| 1st place, gold medalist(s) | Chukwuebuka Enekwechi | Nigeria | 20.06 | 20.07 | 21.22 | 20.44 | 20.72 | 21.22 | 21.22 | |
| 2nd place, silver medalist(s) | Mostafa Amr Hassan | Egypt | 19.56 | 19.81 | 19.63 | 20.25 | x | 20.07 | 20.25 | |
| 3rd place, bronze medalist(s) | Mohamed Khalifa | Egypt | 19.58 | 19.30 | 19.72 | 19.64 | 19.71 | x | 19.72 | |
| 4 | Kyle Blignaut | South Africa | 18.55 | 19.59 | x | x | 19.65 | x | 19.65 | |
| 5 | Burger Lambrechts Jr. | South Africa | 18.43 | 19.10 | 19.10 | 19.09 | x | 19.12 | 19.12 | |
| 6 | Cornelius Kuhn | Namibia | 17.56 | 16.93 | 17.02 | 17.65 | 16.28 | 16.68 | 17.65 | NR |
| 7 | Billy Jospen Takougoum Kuitche | Cameroon | 14.99 | 15.18 | 15.93 | 15.39 | 16.09 | 16.02 | 16.09 | |
| 8 | Desire Kengne Fosso | Cameroon | 14.05 | 13.59 | 14.58 | x | 15.21 | 13.83 | 15.21 | |
| 9 | Zegeye Moga | Ethiopia | 13.56 | 13.85 | 14.53 | | | | 14.53 | |
| 10 | Mekuria Haile | Ethiopia | 13.56 | x | 12.44 | | | | 13.56 | |

== See also ==
- Athletics at the 2023 African Games – Men's shot put
