= 2023 in sports (A) =

This page describes and summarizes the year 2023 in world sporting events for sports starting with the letter "A".

== Air sports ==
=== World championships ===
- March 19 – 25: 2023 FAI F3P World Championships in (Lithuania) Jonava
- April 19–22: 2023 World Indoor Skydiving Championships in (Slovakia) Liptovský Mikuláš
- May 20 – June 3: 2023 World Paragliding Championships in (France) Chamoux-sur-Gelon
- July 1–15: 2023 World Women's Gliding Championships in (Spain) Garray
- July 26 – August 5: 2023 World Glider Aerobatics Championships in (Poland) Toruń
- July 29 – August 5: 2023 World Rally Flying Championships in (France) Mâcon
- August 6–19: 2023 World Hang Gliding Championships in (North Macedonia) Kruševo
- August 22–27: 2023 World Junior Hot Air Ballooning Championships in (Poland) Grudziądz
- September 2–9: 2023 World Women's Hot Air Ballooing Championships in (Australia) Northam
- October 20–28: 2023 World Paragliding Accuracy Championships in (Bulgaria) Sopot
- October 24 – November 4: 2023 World Advanced Aerobatics Championships in (United States) Las Vegas
- December 2–16: 2023 World Gliding Championships in (Australia) Narromine

== American football ==
=== National Football League ===
- January 2: The Week 17 game between the Cincinnati Bengals and the Buffalo Bills is canceled after Bills safety Damar Hamlin suffers a cardiac arrest on the field.
- February 5: 2023 Pro Bowl in (Nevada) Paradise
  - National Football Conference defeated American Football Conference, 35–33
- February 12: Super Bowl LVII in (Arizona) Glendale
  - (Missouri) Kansas City Chiefs defeated (Pennsylvania) Philadelphia Eagles, 38–35
- April 27–29: 2023 NFL draft in (Missouri) Kansas City
  - #1 pick: (Alabama) Bryce Young
- July 21: Washington Commanders owner Daniel Snyder sells the franchise to a group led by Josh Harris for $6.05 billion
- September 7, 2023 – January 7, 2024: 2023 NFL season

=== United States Football League ===
- April 15 – June 25: 2023 USFL season
- July 1: 2023 USFL Championship Game in (Ohio) Canton
  - (Alabama) Birmingham Stallions defeats (Pennsylvania) Pittsburgh Maulers (2022), 28–12.

=== XFL ===
- February 18 – April 29: 2023 XFL season
- May 13: 2023 XFL Championship Game in (Texas) San Antonio
  - (Texas) Arlington Renegades defeats (Washington, D.C.) DC Defenders, 35–26.

=== 2022–23 NCAA football bowl games ===
==== College Football Playoff and National Championship Game ====
- December 30, 2022: 2022 Orange Bowl in (Florida) Miami Gardens
  - The Tennessee Volunteers defeated the (South Carolina) Clemson Tigers, 31–14.
- December 31, 2022: 2022 Sugar Bowl in (Louisiana) New Orleans
  - The Alabama Crimson Tide defeated the Kansas State Wildcats, 45–20.
- December 31, 2022: 2022 Peach Bowl in (Georgia (U.S. state)) Atlanta
  - The (Georgia (U.S. state)) Georgia Bulldogs defeated the Ohio State Buckeyes, 42–41.
- December 31, 2022: 2022 Fiesta Bowl in (Arizona) Glendale
  - The (Texas) TCU Horned Frogs defeated the Michigan Wolverines, 51–45.
- January 2: 2023 Cotton Bowl Classic in (Texas) Arlington
  - The (Louisiana) Tulane Green Wave defeated the (California) USC Trojans, 46–45.
- January 2: 2023 Rose Bowl in (California) Pasadena
  - The (Pennsylvania) Penn State Nittany Lions defeated the Utah Utes, 35–21.
- January 9: 2023 College Football Playoff National Championship in (California) Inglewood
  - The (Georgia (U.S. state)) Georgia Bulldogs defeated the (Texas) TCU Horned Frogs, 65–7, to win their second consecutive National Championship.

==== Non–CFP bowl games ====
- December 16, 2022: 2022 Bahamas Bowl in (The Bahamas) Nassau
  - The (Alabama) UAB Blazers defeated the (Ohio) Miami RedHawks, 24–20.
- December 16, 2022: 2022 Cure Bowl in (Florida) Orlando
  - The (Alabama) Troy Trojans defeated the (Texas) UTSA Roadrunners, 18–12.
- December 17, 2022: 2022 Fenway Bowl in (Massachusetts) Boston
  - The (Kentucky) Louisville Cardinals defeated the (Ohio) Cincinnati Bearcats, 24–7.
- December 17, 2022: 2022 New Mexico Bowl in Albuquerque
  - The (Utah) BYU Cougars defeated the (Texas) SMU Mustangs, 24–23.
- December 17, 2022: 2022 LA Bowl in (California) Inglewood
  - The (California) Fresno State Bulldogs defeated the (Washington (state)) Washington State Cougars, 29–6.
- December 17, 2022: 2022 LendingTree Bowl in (Alabama) Mobile
  - The (Mississippi) Southern Miss Golden Eagles defeated the (Texas) Rice Owls, 38–24.
- December 17, 2022: 2022 Las Vegas Bowl in (Nevada) Paradise
  - The Oregon State Beavers defeated the Florida Gators, 30–3.
- December 17, 2022: 2022 Frisco Bowl in Frisco
  - The (Idaho) Boise State Broncos defeated the North Texas Mean Green, 35–32.
- December 19, 2022: 2022 Myrtle Beach Bowl in (South Carolina) Conway
  - The (West Virginia) Marshall Thundering Herd defeated the (Connecticut) UConn Huskies, 28–14.
- December 20, 2022: 2022 Famous Idaho Potato Bowl in Boise
  - The Eastern Michigan Eagles defeated the (California) San Jose State Spartans, 41–27.
- December 20, 2022: 2022 Boca Raton Bowl in (Florida) Boca Raton
  - The (Ohio) Toledo Rockets defeated the (Virginia) Liberty Flames, 21–19.
- December 21, 2022: 2022 New Orleans Bowl in (Louisiana) New Orleans
  - The Western Kentucky Hilltoppers defeated the South Alabama Jaguars, 44–23.
- December 22, 2022: 2022 Armed Forces Bowl in (Texas) Fort Worth
  - The (Colorado) Air Force Falcons defeated the (Texas) Baylor Bears, 30–15.
- December 23, 2022: 2022 Independence Bowl in Shreveport
  - The (Texas) Houston Cougars defeated the Louisiana Ragin' Cajuns, 23–16.
- December 23, 2022: 2022 Gasparilla Bowl in (Florida) Tampa
  - The (North Carolina) Wake Forest Demon Deacons defeated the Missouri Tigers, 27–17.
- December 24, 2022: 2022 Hawaii Bowl in Honolulu
  - The Middle Tennessee Blue Raiders defeated the (California) San Diego State Aztecs, 25–23.
- December 26, 2022: 2022 Quick Lane Bowl in (Michigan) Detroit
  - The New Mexico State Aggies defeated the (Ohio) Bowling Green Falcons, 24–19.
- December 27, 2022: 2022 Camellia Bowl in (Alabama) Montgomery
  - The (New York (state)) Buffalo Bulls defeated the (Georgia (U.S. state)) Georgia Southern Eagles, 23–21.
- December 27, 2022: 2022 First Responder Bowl in (Texas) University Park
  - The (Tennessee) Memphis Tigers defeated the Utah State Aggies, 38–10.
- December 27, 2022: 2022 Birmingham Bowl in (Alabama) Birmingham
  - The (North Carolina) East Carolina Pirates defeated the (South Carolina) Coastal Carolina Chanticleers, 53–29.
- December 27, 2022: 2022 Guaranteed Rate Bowl in (Arizona) Phoenix
  - The Wisconsin Badgers defeated the Oklahoma State Cowboys, 24–17.
- December 28, 2022: 2022 Military Bowl in (Maryland) Annapolis
  - The (North Carolina) Duke Blue Devils defeated the (Florida) UCF Knights, 30–13.
- December 28, 2022: 2022 Liberty Bowl in (Tennessee) Memphis
  - The Arkansas Razorbacks defeated the Kansas Jayhawks, 55–53.
- December 28, 2022: 2022 Holiday Bowl in (California) San Diego
  - The Oregon Ducks defeated the North Carolina Tar Heels, 28–27.
- December 28, 2022: 2022 Texas Bowl in Houston
  - The Texas Tech Red Raiders defeated the (Mississippi) Ole Miss Rebels, 42–25.
- December 29, 2022: 2022 Pinstripe Bowl in (New York (state)) New York City
  - The Minnesota Golden Gophers defeated the (New York (state)) Syracuse Orange, 28–20.
- December 29, 2022: 2022 Cheez-It Bowl in Orlando
  - The Florida State Seminoles defeated the Oklahoma Sooners, 35–32.
- December 29, 2022: 2022 Alamo Bowl in San Antonio
  - The (Washington (state)) Washington Huskies defeated the Texas Longhorns, 27–20.
- December 30, 2022: 2022 Duke's Mayo Bowl in (North Carolina) Charlotte
  - The Maryland Terrapins defeated the (North Carolina) NC State Wolfpack, 16–12.
- December 30, 2022: 2022 Sun Bowl in (Texas) El Paso
  - The (Pennsylvania) Pittsburgh Panthers defeated the (California) UCLA Bruins, 37–35.
- December 30, 2022: 2022 Gator Bowl in (Florida) Jacksonville
  - The (Indiana) Notre Dame Fighting Irish defeated the South Carolina Gamecocks, 45–38.
- December 30, 2022: 2022 Arizona Bowl in Tucson
  - The Ohio Bobcats defeated the Wyoming Cowboys, 30–27.
- December 31, 2022: 2022 Music City Bowl in (Tennessee) Nashville
  - The Iowa Hawkeyes defeated the Kentucky Wildcats, 21–0.
- January 2: 2023 ReliaQuest Bowl in (Florida) Tampa
  - The Mississippi State Bulldogs defeated the Illinois Fighting Illini, 19–10.
- January 2: 2023 Citrus Bowl in (Florida) Orlando
  - The (Louisiana) LSU Tigers defeated the (Indiana) Purdue Boilermakers, 63–7.

=== Indoor American football ===
- March 17 – August 5: 2023 IFL season
  - (California) Bay Area Panthers defeat (South Dakota) Sioux Falls Storm, 51–41, at championship game in (Nevada) Henderson
- March 10 – June 23: 2023 CIF season
  - (Nebraska) Omaha Beef defeat (Kansas) Salina Liberty, 50–30, at championship game in (Nebraska) Ralston
  - Champions Indoor Football folds after this season, officially merging with the third incarnation of the Arena Football League though some teams left for other leagues.
- April 8 – August 12: 2023 NAL season
  - (Florida) Jacksonville Sharks defeat (North Carolina) Carolina Cobras, 54–45, at championship game in (Florida) Jacksonville

=== European League of Football ===
- June – September 24: 2023 ELF season
- September 24: Championship Game in (Germany) Duisburg
  - (Germany) Rhein Fire defeat (Germany) Stuttgart Surge, 53–34.

=== X-League ===
- January 3: 76th Rice Bowl in (Japan) Tokyo
  - Fujitsu Frontiers defeat the Panasonic Impulse, 29–21

== Aquatics ==
FINA

- July 14–30: 2023 World Aquatics Championships in (Japan) Fukuoka
  - (gold) : China, (silver) : Australia, (bronze) : United States
- August 30 – September 3: 2023 FINA Youth Artistic Swimming Championships in (Greece) Athens

== Archery ==
=== Archery World Championships ===
- July 3–9: 2023 World Archery Youth Championships in (Republic of Ireland) Limerick
  - (gold) : South Korea, (silver) : India, (bronze) : United States
- July 17–23: 2023 World Para Archery Championships in (Czech Republic) Plzeň
  - (gold) : China, (silver) : Italy, (bronze) : Turkey
- July 31 – August 6: 2023 World Archery Championships in Berlin
  - (gold) : India, (silver) : South Korea, (bronze) : Germany, Poland, Turkey

=== 2023 Archery World Cup ===
- April 18–23: AWC #1 in (Turkey) Antalya
  - Recurve individual winners: (Moldova) Dan Olaru (m) / (United Kingdom) Penny Healey (f)
  - Recurve team winners: China (m) / Mexico (f) / United States (mixed)
  - Compound individual winners: (Slovakia) Jozef Bošanský (m) / (India) Jyothi Surekha Vennam (f)
  - Compound team winners: Denmark (m) / United States (f) / India (mixed)
- May 16–21: AWC #2 in (China) Shanghai
  - Recurve individual winners: (Brazil) Marcus D'Almeida (m) / (South Korea) Lim Si-hyeon (f)
  - Recurve team winners: South Korea (m) / South Korea (f) / South Korea (mixed)
  - Compound individual winners: (India) Prathamesh Samadhan Jawkar (m) / (China) Cho Su-a (f)
  - Compound team winners: Netherlands (m) / Mexico (f) / India (mixed)
- June 13–18: AWC #3 in Medellín
  - Recurve individual winners: (Italy) Mauro Nespoli (m) / (South Korea) Lim Si-hyeon (f)
  - Recurve team winners: South Korea (m) / South Korea (f) / United States (mixed)
  - Compound individual winners: (India) Abhishek Verma (m) / (United States) Liko Arreola (f)
  - Compound team winners: Guatemala (m) / United States (f) / Colombia (mixed)
- August 15–20: AWC #4 in (France) Paris
  - Recurve individual winners: (South Korea) Kim Woo-jin (m) / (United States) Casey Kaufhold (f)
  - Recurve team winners: South Korea (m) / South Korea (f) / South Korea (mixed)
  - Compound individual winners: (Slovakia) Jozef Bošanský (m) / (United Kingdom) Ella Gibson (f)
  - Compound team winners: India (m) / India (f) / United States (mixed)
- September 9 & 10: AWC #5 (final) in (Mexico) Hermosillo
  - Recurve individual winners: (Brazil) Marcus D'Almeida (m) / (South Korea) Kang Chae-young (f)
  - Compound individual winners: (Denmark) Mathias Fullerton (m) / (Colombia) Sara López (f)

=== 2022–23 Indoor Archery World Series ===
- November 18–20, 2022: GT Open in (Luxembourg) Strassen
  - Compound winners: (France) Nicolas Girard (m) / (United Kingdom) Ella Gibson (f)
  - Recurve winners: (France) Florent Mulot (m) / (Netherlands) Gabriela Schloesser (f)
- December 10 & 11, 2022: Taipei Archery Open in (Taiwan) Taipei
  - Compound winners: (Netherlands) Mike Schloesser (m) / (India) Muskan Kirar (f)
  - Recurve winners: (Chinese Taipei) Wei Chun-heng (m) / (Netherlands) Gabriela Schloesser (f)
  - Compound U21 winners: (Chinese Taipei) Wang Cheng-ling (m) / (Chinese Taipei) Kuo Yen-yu (f)
  - Recurve U21 winners: (Chinese Taipei) Wu Yu-ming (m) / (Chinese Taipei) Lin Shu-yan (f)
- January 20–22: Sud de France Archery Tournament in Nîmes
  - Barebow winners: (France) Xavier Roussel (m) / (Spain) Ana María Cano García (f)
  - Compound winners: (United States) Kris Schaff (m) / (Estonia) Lisell Jäätma (f)
  - Recurve winners: (France) Thomas Chirault (m) / (Italy) Tatiana Andreoli (f)
- February 3–5: The Vegas Shoot in (United States) Las Vegas
  - Compound winners: (United States) Kris Schaff (m) / (Denmark) Tanja Gellenthien (f)
  - Recurve winners: (Brazil) Marcus D'Almeida (m) / (South Korea) Park So-min (f)
- February 4: Indoor Archery World Series Finals in (United States) Las Vegas
  - Compound winners: (United States) Bodie Turner (m) / (Italy) Elisa Roner (f)
  - Recurve winners: (Netherlands) Steve Wijler (m) / (South Korea) Lim Du-na (f)

== Association football ==
=== FIFA World Cups ===
- February 1–11: 2022 FIFA Club World Cup in Morocco
  - In the final, (Spain) Real Madrid defeated (Saudi Arabia) Al-Hilal 5–3 to win their fifth Club World Cup.
- May 20 – June 11: 2023 FIFA U-20 World Cup in Argentina
  - In the final, Uruguay defeated Italy 1–0 to win their first U20 World Cup.
- July 20 – August 20: 2023 FIFA Women's World Cup in Australia and New Zealand
  - In the final, Spain defeated England 1–0 to win their first Women's World Cup.
- November 10 – December 2: 2023 FIFA U-17 World Cup in Indonesia
  - In the final, Germany defeated France 2–2 (4–3 in penalties) to win their first U17 World Cup.

=== UEFA ===
- April 6: 2023 Women's Finalissima in London
  - In the final, England defeated Brazil 1–1 (4–2 in penalties) to win their first Finalissima.
- April 24: 2022–23 UEFA Youth League Final in (Switzerland) Geneva
  - In the final, (Netherlands) Alkmaar defeated Hadjuk Split 5–0 to win their first Youth League title.
- May 12 – June 4: 2023 UEFA European Under-17 Championship in Hungary
  - In the final, Germany defeated France 5–4 in penalty shootouts to win their second European U17 Title.
- May 14–26: 2023 UEFA Women's Under-17 Championship in Estonia
  - In the final, France defeated Spain 3–2 to win first Women's European U17 title.
- May 31: 2023 UEFA Europa League Final in (Hungary) Budapest
  - In the final, (Spain) Sevilla defeated (Italy) Roma 4–1 in penalty shootouts to win their seventh Europa League title.
- June 4: 2023 UEFA Women's Champions League Final in (Netherlands) Eindhoven
  - In the final, (Spain) Barcelona defeated (Germany) Wolfsburg 3–2 to win their second Women's Champions League title.
- June 7: 2023 UEFA Europa Conference League Final in (Czech Republic) Prague
  - In the final, (England) West Ham United defeated (Italy) Fiorentina 2–1 to win their first Conference League title.
- June 10: 2023 UEFA Champions League Final in (Turkey) Istanbul
  - In the final, (England) Manchester City defeated (Italy) Inter Milan 1–0 to win their first Champions League title.
- June 14–18: 2023 UEFA Nations League Finals in the Netherlands
  - In the final, Spain defeated Croatia 0–0 (5–4 in penalties) to win their first Nations League title.
- June 21 – July 8: 2023 UEFA European Under-21 Championship in Romania and Georgia
  - In the final, England defeated Spain 1–0 to win their third European Under-21 Championship title.
- July 3–16: 2023 UEFA European Under-19 Championship in Malta
- July 18–30: 2023 UEFA Women's Under-19 Championship in Belgium
- August 16: 2023 UEFA Super Cup in (Greece) Piraeus
  - In the match, (England) Manchester City defeated (Spain) Sevilla 1–1 (5–4 in penalties) to win their first Super Cup.
- TBA for June: 2023 UEFA Regions' Cup Final (location TBA)

=== CONMEBOL ===
- January 19 – February 12: 2023 South American U-20 Championship in Colombia
  - Brazil won by round robin in the final round.
- February 7 – November 11: 2023 Copa Libertadores
  - In the final, (Brazil) Fluminense defeated (Argentina) Boca Juniors 2–1 to win the title.
- February 21 & 28: 2023 Recopa Sudamericana
  - In the final, (Ecuador) Independiente del Valle defeated (Brazil) Flamengo 1–1 (aggregate) (5–4 in penalties) to win the title.
- March 7 – October 28: 2023 Copa Sudamericana
  - In the final, (Ecuador) LDU Quito defeated (Brazil) Fortaleza 1–1 (4–3 in penalties) to win the title.
- March 30 – April 23: 2023 South American U-17 Championship in Ecuador
  - Brazil won by round robin in the final round.
- July 1–16: 2023 U-20 Copa Libertadores in Chile
  - In the final, (Argentina) Boca Juniors defeated (Ecuador) Independiente del Valle 2–0 to win the title.
- October 5–21: 2023 Copa Libertadores Femenina in Colombia
  - In the final, (Brazil) Corinthians defeated (Brazil) Palmeiras 1–0 to win the title.
- November 17 – December 3: 2023 South American U-15 Championship in Bolivia

=== AFC ===
- March 1–18: 2023 AFC U-20 Asian Cup in Uzbekistan
  - In the final, Uzbekistan defeated Iraq 1–0 to win the title.
- April 29 & May 6: 2022 AFC Champions League Final in Saudi Arabia and Japan
  - In the final, (Japan) Urawa Red Diamonds defeated (Saudi Arabia) Al-Hilal 2–1 (aggregate) to win the title.
- June 15 – July 2: 2023 AFC U-17 Asian Cup in Thailand
  - In the final, Japan defeated South Korea 3–0 to win the title.
- TBA: 2023 AFC Women's Club Championship (location TBA)

=== CAF ===
- January 13 – February 4: 2022 African Nations Championship in Algeria
  - In the final, Senegal defeated Algeria 0–0 (5–4 in penalties) to win the title.
- February 19 – March 11: 2023 U-20 Africa Cup of Nations in Egypt
  - In the final, Senegal defeated (The Gambia) Gambia 2–0 to win the title.
- April 29 – May 19: 2023 U-17 Africa Cup of Nations in Algeria
  - In the final, Senegal defeated Morocco 2–1 to win the title.
- June 4 & 11: 2022–23 CAF Champions League Final in Egypt & Morocco
  - In the final, (Egypt) Al Ahly defeated (Morocco) Wydad AC 3–2 (aggregate) to win the title.
- June 24 – July 8: 2023 U-23 Africa Cup of Nations in Morocco
  - In the final, Morocco defeated Egypt 2–1 to win the title.
- September 15: 2023 CAF Super Cup in Saudi Arabia
  - In the final, (Algeria) USM Alger defeated (Egypt) Al Ahly 1–0 to win the title.
- May 28 & and June 3: 2022–23 CAF Confederation Cup Final in Algeria & Tanzania
- November 19: 2023 CAF Women's Champions League Final in Ivory Coast
  - In the final, (South Africa) Mamelodi Sundowns defeated (Morocco) SC Casablanca 2–1 to win the title.

=== CONCACAF ===
- February 11–26: 2023 CONCACAF U-17 Championship in Guatemala
  - In the final, Mexico defeated United States 3–1 to win the title.
- May 31 & June 4: 2023 CONCACAF Champions League Final in United States & Mexico
  - In the final, (Mexico) León defeated (United States) Los Angeles FC 3–1 (aggregate) to win the title.
- June 15–18: 2023 CONCACAF Nations League Finals in United States
  - In the final, United States defeated Canada 2–0 to win the title.
- June 24 – July 16: 2023 CONCACAF Gold Cup in United States & Canada
  - In the final, Mexico defeated Panama 1–0 to win the title.
- July 21 – August 19: 2023 Leagues Cup in Canada and the United States
  - In the final, (United States) Inter Miami CF defeated (United States) Nashville SC 1–1 (10–9 in penalties) to win the title.

=== OFC ===
- May 27: 2023 OFC Champions League Final in (Vanuatu) Port Vila
  - In the final, (New Zealand) Auckland City defeated (Fiji) Suva 4–2 to win their 11th Champions League title.
- June 1–10: 2023 OFC Women's Champions League in Papua New Guinea
  - (New Caledonia) AS Academy finished top of the round robin to win their first Women's Champions League.
- June 21 – July 8: 2023 OFC U-19 Women's Championship in Fiji
  - In the final, New Zealand defeated Fiji 7–0 to win the title.
- September 13–26: 2023 OFC U-16 Women's Championship in Tahiti
  - In the final, New Zealand defeated Fiji 1–0 to win the title.

== Athletics ==
=== 2023 World Athletics Series ===
- February 18: 2023 World Athletics Cross Country Championships in (Australia) Bathurst
  - (gold) : Kenya, (silver) : Ethiopia, (bronze) : Uganda
- August 19–27: 2023 World Athletics Championships in (Hungary) Budapest
  - (gold) : United States, (silver) : Canada, (bronze) : Spain
- September 30 & October 1: 2023 World Athletics Road Running Championships in (Latvia) Riga
  - (gold) : Kenya, (silver) : Ethiopia, (bronze) : United States

=== NACAC ===
- March 19: 2023 Pan American Marathon Championships in (Venezuela) Caracas
- March 26: 2023 NACAC Half Marathon Championships in (Cuba) Varadero
- April 15 & 16: 2023 Pan American Race Walking Cup in (Nicaragua) Managua
- May 13 & 14: 2023 Pan American Combined Events Cup in (Canada) Ottawa
- July 21–23: 2023 NACAC U18 and U23 Championships in Athletics (location TBA)
- August 4–6: 2023 Pan American U20 Athletics Championships in (Puerto Rico) Mayagüez

=== CONSUDATLE ===
- January 22: 2023 South American Cross Country Championships in Poços de Caldas
  - 10 km winners: (Brazil) Fábio Jesus Correia (m) / (Brazil) Lucineida Moreira (f)
  - Men's U20 8 km winner: (Croatia) Pedro Marín
  - Women's U20 6 km winner: (Brazil) Gabriela de Freitas Tardivo
  - Men's U18 6 km winner: (Argentina) Salvador Lucero
  - Women's U18 4 km winner: (Chile) Amparo Herrera
  - 4x2000 Mixed winners: Brazil (Leandro Alves Prates, July Ferreira da Silva, Jessica Ladeira Soares, Jânio Marcos Varjão)
- TBA: 2023 South American Championships in Athletics (location TBA)
- TBA: 2023 South American U20 Championships in Athletics (location TBA)

=== European Athletic Association ===
- January 22: 2023 Mediterranean U23 Indoor Championships in (Spain) Valencia
  - 60 m winners: (France) William Aguessy (m) / (Greece) Polyniki Emmanouilidou (f)
  - 400 m winners: (Spain) Markel Fernández (m) / (Croatia) Veronika Drljačić (f)
  - 800 m winners: (France) Yanis Meziane (m) / (Croatia) Nina Vuković (f)
  - 1500 m winners: (Spain) Mohamed Attaoui (m) / (Croatia) Klara Andrijašević (f)
  - 60 m Hurdles winners: (Greece) Christos-Panagiotis Roumtsios (m) / (Spain) Paula Blanquer (f)
  - Women's Pole Vault winner: (France) Elina Giallurachis
  - Men's High Jump winner: (Italy) Edoardo Stronati
  - Women's Long Jump winner: (Italy) Larissa Iapichino
  - Men's Triple Jump winner: (France) Thomas Martinez
  - Men's Shot Put winner: (Spain) Miguel Gómez
- February 5 : European Champion Clubs Cup Cross Country in (Spain) Oropesa del Mar
- March 2–5: 2023 European Athletics Indoor Championships in (Turkey) Istanbul
- May 21: 2023 European Race Walking Team Championships in (Czech Republic) Poděbrady
- June 23–25: 2023 European Athletics Team Championships in Chorzów
  - (gold) : Italy, (silver) : Poland, (bronze) : Germany
- July 13–16: 2023 European Athletics U23 Championships in (Finland) Espoo
  - (gold) : United Kingdom, (silver) : France, (bronze) : Netherlands
- August 7–10: 2023 European Athletics U20 Championships in (Israel) Jerusalem
  - (gold) : Germany, (silver) : Sweden, (bronze) : Czech Republic
- December 10: 2023 European Cross Country Championships in (Belgium) Brussels

=== Asian Athletics Association ===
- February 10–12: 2023 Asian Indoor Athletics Championships in Nur-Sultan
  - (gold) : Japan, (silver) : Kazakhstan, (bronze) : Qatar
- April 20–23: 2023 Asian U18 Athletics Championships in (Uzbekistan) Tashkent
  - (gold) : China, (silver) : India, (bronze) : Kazakhstan
- June 4–7: 2023 Asian U20 Athletics Championships in (South Korea) Yecheon County
  - (gold) : Japan, (silver) : China, (bronze) : India
- July 12–16: 2023 Asian Athletics Championships in (Thailand) Bangkok
  - (gold) : Japan, (silver) : China, (bronze) : India
- TBA: 2023 Asian Marathon Championships (location TBA)

=== 2023 World Marathon Majors ===
- March 5: 2023 Tokyo Marathon in (Japan) Tokyo
  - Male winner: (Ethiopia) Deso Gelmisa
  - Female winner: (Kenya) Rosemary Wanjiru
- April 17: 2023 Boston Marathon in (United States) Boston
  - Male winner: (Kenya) Evans Chebet
  - Female winner: (Kenya) Hellen Obiri
- April 23: 2023 London Marathon in (United Kingdom) London
  - Male winner: (Kenya) Kelvin Kiptum
  - Female winner: (Netherlands) Sifan Hassan
- September 24: 2023 Berlin Marathon in Germany Berlin
  - Male winner: (Kenya) Eliud Kipchoge
  - Female winner: (Ethiopia) Tigst Assefa
- October 8: 2023 Chicago Marathon in (United States) Chicago
  - Male winner: (Kenya) Kelvin Kiptum
  - Female winner: (Netherlands) Sifan Hassan
- November 5: 2023 New York City Marathon (final) in (United States) New York City
  - Male winner: (Ethiopia) Tamirat Tola
  - Female winner: (Kenya) Hellen Obiri

=== 2023 Diamond League ===
- May 5: 2023 Doha Diamond League in Qatar
- May 28: Meeting International Mohammed VI d'Athlétisme de Rabat in Morocco
- June 2: Golden Gala in (Italy) Rome
- June 9: 2023 Meeting de Paris in France
- June 15: Bislett Games in (Norway) Oslo
- June 30: Athletissima in (Switzerland) Lausanne
- July 2: BAUHAUS-galan in (Sweden) Stockholm
- July 16: Kamila Skolimowska Memorial in (Poland) Silesia
- July 21: Herculis in (Monaco) Fontvieille
- July 23: Anniversary Games in (United Kingdom) London
- July 29: Diamond League Shanghai in China
- August 3: Diamond League Shenzhen in China
- August 31: 2023 Weltklasse Zürich in Switzerland
- September 8: Memorial Van Damme in (Belgium) Brussels
- September 16 & 17: Prefontaine Classic (final) in (United States) Eugene, Oregon

=== 2023 World Athletics Label Road Races ===
Gold

- January 15: Mumbai Marathon in India
  - Winners: (Ethiopia) Lemi Berhanu Hayle (m) / (Ethiopia) Anchialem Haymanot (f)
- January 15: Houston Marathon in United States
  - Winners: (Kenya) Dominic Ondoro (m) / (Japan) Hitomi Niiya (f)
- January 15: Houston Half Marathon in United States
  - Winners: (Ethiopia) Leul Aleme (m) / (Ethiopia) Hiwot Gebremaryam (f)
- February 4: Lagos City Marathon in Nigeria

Platinum

- January 29: Osaka International Women's Marathon in Japan
  - Winner: (Ethiopia) Haven Hailu Desse

Elite

- January 20: Doha Marathon in Qatar
  - Winners: (Morocco) Mouhcine Outalha (m) / (Ethiopia) Meseret Belete (f)
- January 21: Buriram Marathon in Thailand
  - Winners: (Kenya) Titus Kimutai (m) / (Kenya) Agnes Keino (f)
- February 5: Beppu-Ōita Marathon in (Japan) Beppu
- February 5: Kagawa Marugame Half Marathon in (Japan) Marugame

Label

- January 15: 10K Valencia Ibercaja in Spain
  - Winners: (Kenya) Weldon Langat (f) / (Ethiopia) Yalemzerf Yehualaw (f)
- January 22: Mitja Marató Internacional Vila de Santa Pola in Spain
  - Winners: (Kenya) Benard Biwott (m) / (Kenya) Beatrice Cheserek (f)
- January 29: Marrakech Marathon in Morocco
  - Winners: (Kenya) Gilbert Kibet (m) / (Morocco) Kaltoum Bouaasayriya (f)
- January 29: 10K Ibiza – Platja d'en Bossa in Spain
  - Winners: (Kenya) Benson Kiplangat (m) / (Kenya) Caroline Nyaga (f)

=== 2023 World Athletics Indoor Tour ===
Gold

- January 27: Init Indoor Meeting in Germany
  - Women's 60 m winner: (United Kingdom) Dina Asher-Smith
  - Men's 400 m winner: (Denmark) Benjamin Lobo Vedel
  - Women's 800 m winner: (Slovenia) Anita Horvat
  - Men's 1500 m winner: (United Kingdom) George Mills
  - Women's 3000 m winner: (Ethiopia) Lemlem Hailu
  - Men's 60 m Hurdles winner: (Spain) Enrique Llopis
  - Women's Triple Jump winner: (Cuba) Liadagmis Povea
  - Women's Shot Put winner: (Portugal) Auriol Dongmo
- February 4: New Balance Indoor Grand Prix in (United States) Boston
  - Women's 60 m winner: (United States) Aleia Hobbs
  - Men's 400 m winner: (United States) Noah Williams
  - Women's 800 m winner: (United States) Ajeé Wilson
  - Women's 3000 m winner: (United States) Laura Muir
  - Men's 60 m Hurdles winner: (United States) Grant Holloway
  - Men's High Jump winner: (India) Tejaswin Shankar
  - Women's Pole Vault winner: (United States) Bridget Williams
- February 8: Copernicus Cup in (Poland) Toruń
  - Women's 60 m winner: (Switzerland) Mujinga Kambundji
  - Men's 400 m winner: (Sweden) Carl Bengtström
  - Women's 800 m winner: (United Kingdom) Keely Hodgkinson
  - Men's 1500 m winner: (France) Azeddine Habz
  - Women's 3000 m winner: (Ethiopia) Freweyni Hailu
  - Men's 60 m Hurdles winner: (United States) Daniel Roberts
  - Men's High Jump winner: (New Zealand) Hamish Kerr
  - Men's Long Jump winner: (Sweden) Thobias Montler
- February 11: Millrose Games in (United States) New York City
  - Women's 60 m winner: (United States) Aleia Hobbs
  - Men's 400 m winner: (Trinidad and Tobago) Jereem Richards
  - Women's 600 m winner: (United States) Ajeé Wilson
  - Men's Mile winner: (United States) Yared Nuguse
  - Women's 3000 m winner: (United States) Alicia Monson
  - Women's Pole Vault winner: (United States) Katie Moon
  - Women's Shot Put winner: (United States) Chase Ealey
- February 15: Meeting Hauts-de-France Pas-de-Calais in Liévin
  - Women's 800 m winner: (United Kingdom) Keely Hodgkinson
  - Men's 1500 winner: (Norway) Jakob Ingebrigtsen
  - Women's 3000 m winner: (Ethiopia) Diribe Welteji
  - Men's 60 m Hurdles winner: (United States) Grant Holloway
  - Men's Long Jump winner: (Greece) Miltiadis Tentoglou
  - Women's Pole Vault winner: (United States) Katie Moon
  - Women's Triple Jump winner: (Cuba) Liadagmis Povea
- February 22: World Indoor Tour Madrid in (Spain) Madrid
  - Women's 60 m winner: (Niger) Aminatou Seyni
  - Men's 800 m winner: (Spain) Óscar Husillos
  - Women's 800 m winner: (Benin) Noélie Yarigo
  - Men's 1500 winner: (United States) Yared Nuguse
  - Men's Long Jump winner: (Greece) Miltiadis Tentoglou
  - Women's Pole Vault winner: (Canada) Alysha Newman
  - Women's Triple Jump winner: (Cuba) Liadagmis Povea
  - Women's Shot Put winner: (Canada) Sarah Mitton
- February 25: Birmingham World Indoor Tour Final in (United Kingdom) Birmingham
  - Women's 60 m winner: (United Kingdom) Dina Asher-Smith
  - Men's 400 m winner: (Trinidad and Tobago) Jereem Richards
  - Women's 800 m winner: (United Kingdom) Keely Hodgkinson
  - Men's 1500 winner: (United Kingdom) Neil Gourley
  - Women's 3000 winner: (Ethiopia) Gudaf Tsegay
  - Men's 60 m Hurdles winner: (United States) Grant Holloway
  - Men's High Jump winner: (New Zealand) Hamish Kerr
  - Men's Long Jump winner: (United States) Marquis Dendy
  - Women's Pole Vault winner: (Canada) Alysha Newman

Silver

- January 21: American Track League – Hawkeye Pro Classic in (United States) Iowa City
  - Men's Shot Put indoor winner: (Nigeria) Chukwuebuka Enekwechi
  - Women's High Jump indoor winner: (United States) Vashti Cunningham
- January 23: Astana Meeting in Kazakhstan
  - 60 m winners: (United States) Mike Rodgers (m) / (Portugal) Arialis Gandulla (f)
  - 400 m winners: (Kazakhstan) Mikhail Litvin (m) / (Kazakhstan) Elina Mikhina (f)
  - Men's 800 m winner: (Croatia) Marino Bloudek
  - Women's 1500 m winner: (Kenya) Jarinter Mwasya
  - Men's 3000 m winner: (Ethiopia) Ali Abdilmana
  - Men's 60 m Hurdles winner: (Cuba) Roger Iribarne
  - Women's High Jump winner: (Kazakhstan) Nadezhda Dubovitskaya
  - Women's Triple Jump winner: (Uzbekistan) Darya Reznichenko
- January 27: LILAC Grand Prix in (United States) Spokane
  - 800 winners: (Kenya) Noah Kibet (m) / (United States) Kaela Edwards (f)
  - 1500 m winners: (Germany) Amos Bartelsmeyer (m) / (United States) Sinclaire Johnson (f)
  - 3000 m winners: (United States) Cole Hocker (m) / (United States) Ella Donaghu (f)
- January 29: ISTAF Indoor Düsseldorf in Germany
  - 60 m winners: (United Kingdom) Jeremiah Azu (m) / (Poland) Ewa Swoboda (f)
  - 60 m Hurdles winners: (Poland) Jakub Szymański (m) / (Poland) Pia Skrzyszowska (f)
  - Men's Pole Vault winner: (United States) KC Lightfoot
  - Women's Long Jump winner: (Germany) Malaika Mihambo
- January 31: Hvězdy v Nehvizdech in Czech Republic
  - High Jump winners: (Belgium) Thomas Carmoy (m) / (Kazakhstan) Kristina Ovchinnikova (f)
  - Shot Put winners: (Czech Republic) Tomáš Staněk (f) / (Canada) Sarah Mitton (f)
- February 2: Czech Indoor Gala 2023 in (Czech Republic) Ostrava
  - Men's 60 m winner: (United Kingdom) Jeremiah Azu
  - Men's 200 m winner: (United Kingdom) Reynier Mena
  - 400 m winners: (Netherlands) Isayah Boers (m) / (Netherlands) Lieke Klaver (f)
  - Men's 800 m winner: (Tunisia) Abdessalem Ayouni
  - Men's Mile winner: (Serbia) Elzan Bibić
  - Women's 1500 m winner: (Ethiopia) Tigist Ketema
  - 60 m Hurdles winners: (Cuba) Roger Iribarne (m) / (United States) Alaysha Johnson (f)
  - Women's Pole Vault winner: (Slovenia) Tina Šutej
  - Men's Long Jump winner: (Cuba) Lester Lescay
  - Women's Triple Jump winner: (Slovenia) Neja Filipič
- February 4: Meeting de l'Eure in (France) Val-de-Reuil
  - 60 m winners: (United States) Brandon Carnes (m) / (United States) Morolake Akinosun (f)
  - 60 m Hurdles winners: (United States) Michael Dickson (m) / (United States) Alaysha Johnson (f)
  - High Jump winners: (France) Elijah Pasquier (m) / (Ukraine) Yaroslava Mahuchikh (f)
  - Men's Triple Jump winner: (Burkina Faso) Hugues Fabrice Zango
  - Women's Triple Jump winner: (Finland) Wilma Murto
  - Shot Put winners: (Italy) Leonardo Fabbri (m) / (Sweden) Fanny Roos (f)
- February 4: Hustopečské skákání in (Czech Republic) Hustopeče
  - High Jump winners: (New Zealand) Hamish Kerr (m) / (United Kingdom) Morgan Lake (f)
- February 7: Beskydská laťka in (Czech Republic) Třinec
  - High Jump winners: (Cuba) Luis Zayas (m) / (Ukraine) Iryna Herashchenko (f)
- February 8: Mondeville Meeting in France
  - 60 m winners: (Kenya) Ferdinand Omanyala (m) / (Barbados) Tristan Evelyn (f)
  - 60 m Hurdles winners: (United States) Michael Dickson (m) / (United States) Alaysha Johnson (f)
  - Men's Pole Vault winner: (United States) Jacob Wooten
  - Women's Triple Jump winner: (Cuba) Leyanis Pérez
  - Women's High Jump winner: (Ukraine) Yuliia Levchenko

Bronze

- January 21: Jablonec Indoor 2023 in Czech Republic
  - 60 m winners: (Turkey) Kayhan Özer (m) / (United Kingdom) Dina Asher-Smith (f)
  - Men's Shot Put winner: (Czech Republic) Tomáš Staněk
- January 22: CMCM Indoor Meeting in Luxembourg
  - Women's 60 m winner: (Luxembourg) Patrizia van der Weken
  - Men's 400 m winner: (Belgium) Alexander Doom
  - 800 m winners: (Belgium) Tibo De Smet (m) / (Kenya) Naomi Korir (f)
  - Women's 1500 m winner: (Kenya) Josephine Chelangat Kiplangat
  - Men's 3000 m winner: (France) Simon Denissel
  - 60 m Hurdles winners: (Spain) Asier Martínez (m) / (Cyprus) Natalia Christofi (f)
  - Women's High Jump winner: (France) Solène Gicquel
  - Women's Triple Jump winner: (France) Ilionis Guillaume
  - Men's Shot Put winner: (Luxembourg) Bob Bertemes
- January 25: International Jump Meeting Cottbus in Germany
  - Men's Pole Vault winner: (United States) Sam Kendricks
  - Women's High Jump winner: (Ukraine) Yaroslava Mahuchikh
- January 25: Aarhus SPRINT'n'JUMP in Denmark
  - 60 m winners: (United Kingdom) Adam Thomas (m) / (Iceland) Guðbjörg Jóna Bjarnadóttir (f)
  - 60 m Hurdles winners: (Poland) Krzysztof Kiljan (m) / (Republic of Ireland) Sarah Lavin (f)
  - Long Jump winners: (North Macedonia) Andreas Trajkovski (m) / (United Kingdom) Molly Palmer (f)
  - Women's Triple Jump winner: (Italy) Ottavia Cestonaro
- January 28: Dr. Sander Invitational in (United States) New York City
  - 60 m winners: (United States) Travis Williams (m) / (United States) Jayla Jamison (f)
  - 5000 m winners: (Portugal) Rogério Amaral (m) / (United States) Caroline Webb (f)
  - 60 m Hurdles winners: (United States) Terrel Williams (m) / (Belgium) Yanla Ndjip-Nyemeck (f)
  - Men's Pole Vault winner: (United States) Travis Snyder
  - Long Jump winners: (United States) Camryn O'Bannon (m) / (United States) Kayla Woods (f)
  - Triple Jump winners: (United States) Altan Mitchell (m) / (United States) Helen Chu (f)
  - Shot Put winners: (United States) Jeff Kline (m) / (United States) Kathleen Young (f)
  - Women's Distance Medley winners: (United States) (Danielle Adams, Elise O'Leary, Megan Perrotta, Randi Burr)
- January 28: Meeting National Indoor Lyon in France
  - Men's 60 m winner: (Turkey) Kayhan Özer
  - 800 m winners: (Morocco) Abdelati El Guesse (m) / (France) Charlotte Pizzo (f)
  - 1500 m winners: (Switzerland) Tom Elmer (m) / (Netherlands) Marissa Damink (f)
  - 3000 m winners: (Ethiopia) Ali Abdilmana (m) / (Ethiopia) Tigist Ketema (f)
  - 60 m Hurdles winners: (France) Dimitri Bascou (m) / (Netherlands) Maayke Tjin-A-Lim (f)
  - Men's Long Jump winner: (Cuba) Lester Lescay
  - Women's Triple Jump winner: (Italy) Dariya Derkach
- January 28: Kladno INDOOR 2023 in Czech Republic
  - High Jump winners: (Mexico) Erik Portillo (m) / (Ukraine) Yuliya Chumachenko (f)
  - Shot Put winners: (Czech Republic) Tomáš Staněk (m) / (Canada) Sarah Mitton (f)
- January 28: Manchester World Indoor Tour BRONZE in United Kingdom
  - Men's 60 m winner: (United Kingdom) Medwin Odamtten
  - Men's 400 m winner: (United Kingdom) Lee Thompson
  - Women's 600 m winner: (United Kingdom) Keely Hodgkinson
  - 800 m winners: (Italy) Simone Barontini (m) / (United Kingdom) Isabelle Boffey (f)
  - Women's 1500 m winner: (United Kingdom) Ellie Baker
  - 3000 m winners: (Sweden) Emil Danielsson (m) / (United Kingdom) Jennifer Nesbitt
  - Women's 60 m Hurdles winner: (Cyprus) Natalia Christofi
  - Men's Long Jump winner: (Romania) Gabriel Bitan
  - Women's Triple Jump winner: (Germany) Caroline Joyeux
  - Shot Put winners: (United Kingdom) Scott Lincoln (m) / (Germany) Yemisi Magdalena Ogunleye (f)
- January 28: Meeting indoor Nantes Métropole in France
  - 60 m winners: (United Kingdom) Eugene Amo-Dadzie (m) / (Switzerland) Melissa Gutschmidt (f)
  - 400 m winners: (Portugal) João Coelho (m) / (France) Camille Seri (f)
  - 800 m winners: (Poland) Filip Ostrowski (m) / (Kenya) Naomi Korir (f)
  - 60 m Hurdles winners: (Finland) Elmo Lakka (m) / (France) Cyréna Samba-Mayela (f)
  - Men's Pole Vault winner: (France) Valentin Pottier
  - Women's High Jump winner: (Ukraine) Iryna Herashchenko
  - Long Jump winners: (France) Jean-Pierre Bertrand (m) / (France) Tiphaine Mauchant (f)
- January 29: Folksam GP Stockholm Indoor 2023 in Sweden
  - 60 m winners: (Sweden) Henrik Larsson (m) / (Switzerland) Salomé Kora (f)
  - 400 m winners: (Denmark) Gustav Lundholm Nielsen (m) / (Latvia) Gunta Vaičule (f)
  - 800 m winners: (Sweden) Andreas Kramer (m) / (Kenya) Vivian Chebet Kiprotich (f)
  - Men's 1500 m winner: (France) Azeddine Habz
  - Women's 60 m Hurdles winner: (Finland) Annimari Korte
  - Men's High Jump winner: (Ukraine) Andriy Protsenko
  - Long Jump winners: (Sweden) Thobias Montler (m) / (Sweden) Tilde Johansson (f)
  - Women's Shot Put winner: (Jamaica) Danniel Thomas-Dodd
- February 3: Elite Indoor Track Miramas Meeting in France
  - Men's 60 m winner: (Ivory Coast) Arthur Cissé
  - Men's 400 m winner: (France) Muhammad Abdallah Kounta
  - Men's 800 m winner: (Algeria) Mohamed Belbachir
  - Women's 1500 m winner: (Italy) Ludovica Cavalli
  - Men's 3000 m winner: (Ethiopia) Ali Abdilmana
  - 60 m Hurdles winners: (Finland) Ilari Manninen (m) / (Cyprus) Dafni Georgiou (f)
  - Men's High Jump winner: (Algeria) Hichem Bouhanoun
  - Women's Triple Jump winner: (Turkey) Tuğba Danışmaz
  - Men's Pole Vault winner: (China) Yao Jie
- February 3: BKK Freundenberg High Jump Meeting in (Germany) Weinheim
  - Winners: (Germany) Jonas Wagner (m) / (Germany) Christina Honsel (f)
- February 4: ORLEN Cup Łódź 2023 in Poland
  - 60 m winners: (Italy) Marcell Jacobs (m) / (Poland) Ewa Swoboda (f)
  - 60 m Hurdles winners: (Cuba) Roger Iribarne (m) / (Poland) Pia Skrzyszowska (f)
  - Men's High Jump winner: (Poland) Norbert Kobielski
  - Men's Pole Vault winner: (Philippines) Ernest John Obiena
  - Men's Shot Put winner: (Czech Republic) Tomáš Staněk
- February 4: IFAM Gent Indoor in Belgium
  - 60 m winners: (United Kingdom) Reece Prescod (m) / (Belgium) Delphine Nkansa (f)
  - 60 m Hurdles winners: (Sweden) Max Hrelja (m) / (Netherlands) Maayke Tjin-A-Lim (f)
  - Men's Pole Vault winner: (United States) Matt Ludwig
  - Women's High Jump winner: (Belgium) Merel Maes
  - Women's Long Jump winner: (Netherlands) Pauline Hondema

Challenger

- January 25: Meeting Internacional Ciudad de Valencia in Spain
  - 60 m winners: (Spain) Sergio López (m) / (Portugal) Rosalina Santos (f)
  - 400 m winners: (Italy) Lorenzo Benati (m) / (Spain) Laura Hernández (f)
  - 800 m winners: (Romania) Cristian Gabriel Voicu (m) / (Spain) Lorea Ibarzabal (f)
  - 1500 m winners: (Austria) Raphael Pallitsch (m) / (Argentina) Florencia Borelli (f)
  - 3000 m winners: (Argentina) Federico Bruno (m) / (Spain) Águeda Marqués (f)
  - 60 m Hurdles: (Spain) Enrique Llopis (m) / (Spain) Paula Blanquer (f)
  - Men's Pole Vault winner: (Spain) Aleix Pi
  - Women's High Jump winner: (Portugal) Anabela Neto
  - Long Jump winners: (Germany) Maximilian Entholzner (m) / (Spain) Fátima Diame (f)
  - Triple Jump winners: (Burkina Faso) Hugues Fabrice Zango (m) / (Spain) Osasere Eghosa (f)
  - Shot Put winners: (Spain) José Ángel Pinedo (m) / (Spain) Judit Prats (f)
- January 28: Nordhausen Indoor Shot Put in Germany
  - Shot Put winners: (Luxembourg) Bob Bertemes (m) / (Germany) Sara Gambetta (f)
- January 28: PERCHE EN OR in (France) Roubaix
  - Winner: (Philippines) Ernest John Obiena
- January 28: Meeting Internacional Catalunya Pista Coberta in (Spain) Sabadell
  - 60 m winners: (Italy) Samuele Ceccarelli (m) / (Spain) Jaël Bestué (f)
  - 400 m winners: (Spain) Iñaki Cañal (m) / (Czech Republic) Tereza Petržilková (f)
  - 800 m winners: (Spain) Mariano García (m) / (Spain) Lorea Ibarzabal (f)
  - Women's 1500 m winner: (Spain) Águeda Marqués
  - 60 m Hurdles winners: (Cuba) Roger Iribarne (m) / (Spain) Xènia Benach (f)
  - Women's High Jump winner: (Ukraine) Kateryna Tabashnyk
  - Women's Long Jump winner: (Italy) Larissa Iapichino
  - Men's Pole Vault winner: (Italy) Claudio Stecchi
  - Men's Shot Put winner: (Ukraine) Roman Kokoshko
- January 29: Elán Míting in (Slovakia) Bratislava
  - 60 m winners: (Slovakia) Ján Volko (m) / (Slovakia) Monika Weigertová (f)
  - 400 m winners: (Slovakia) Miroslav Marček (m) / (Slovakia) Simona Malatincová (f)
  - 800 m winners: (Czech Republic) Tomáš Vystrk (m) / (Romania) Cristina Daniela Bălan (f)
  - 3000 m winners: (Slovakia) Peter Kováč (m) / (Slovakia) Žofia Naňová (f)
  - 60 m Hurdles winners: (Hungary) Valdó Szűcs (m) / (Slovakia) Viktória Forster (f)
  - Long Jump winners: (Slovakia) Adam Hriň (m) / (Slovakia) Monika Lehenová (f)
- February 2: Karsten Warholm Invitation AL in (Norway) Ulsteinvik
  - Women's 60 m winner: (Jamaica) Elaine Thompson-Herah
  - 200 m winners: (Finland) Oskari Lehtonen (m) / (Belgium) Imke Vervaet (f)
  - 400 m winners: (Norway) Karsten Warholm (m) / (Norway) Henriette Jæger (f)
  - 800 m winners: (Kenya) Nicholas Kiplangat Kebenei (m) / (Netherlands) Danaid Prinsen (f)
  - 1500 m winners: (Kenya) Cornelius Tuwei (m) / (Norway) Amalie Sæten (f)
  - Women's High Jump winner: (Ukraine) Yaroslava Mahuchikh
  - Long Jump winners: (Ghana) Abraham Seaneke (m) / (Norway) Thale Leirfall (f)
  - Men's Shot Put winner: (Luxembourg) Bob Bertemes
- February 2: Duplantis Classic in (Sweden) Uppsala
  - Men's Pole Vault winner: (Sweden) Armand Duplantis
- February 2: Gothenburg Indoor in Sweden
  - 60 m winners: (China) Su Bingtian (m) / (Sweden) Julia Henriksson (f)
  - Women's 200 m winner: (Sweden) Julia Henriksson
  - Men's 400 m winner: (Sweden) Carl Bengtström
  - 800 m winners: (Sweden) Andreas Kramer (m) / (Slovakia) Gabriela Gajanová (f)
  - Women's 3000 m winner: (Norway) Kristine Eikrem Engeset
  - Women's High Jump winner: (Sweden) Matilda Nilsson
  - Long Jump winners: (Greece) Miltiadis Tentoglou (m) / (Sweden) Khaddi Sagnia (f)
  - Triple Jump winners: (Greece) Andreas Pantazis (m) / (Lithuania) Aina Grikšaitė (f)
- February 3: Filathlitikos Kallithea International High Jump Indoor Meeting in Greece
  - High Jump winners: (Greece) Antonios Merlos (m) / (Serbia) Angelina Topić (f)
- February 3: 10. Breuninger Hallenmeeting in (Germany) Erfurt
  - 60 m winners: (Germany) Julian Wagner (m) / (Germany) Malaika Mihambo (f)
  - 200 m winners: (Germany) Benedikt Wallstein (m) / (Czech Republic) Natálie Kožuškaničová (f)
  - 400 m winners: (Germany) Marvin Schlegel (m) / (Germany) Alica Schmidt (f)
  - 800 m winners: (United Kingdom) Guy Learmonth (m) / (Germany) Majtie Kolberg (f)
  - 1500 m winners: (Germany) Sven Wagner (m) / (United Kingdom) Cari Hughes (f)
  - Women's 60 m Hurdles winner: Marlene Meier
  - Women's Pole Vault winner: (Poland) Agnieszka Kaszuba
  - Men's Long Jump winner: (Germany) Valentin Brenner
  - Women's Triple Jump winner: (Italy) Dariya Derkach
- February 5: 17th Rochlitz Shot Put Meeting in Germany
  - Winners: (Italy) Zane Weir (m) / (Portugal) Auriol Dongmo (f)
- February 5: Reykjavik International Games in Iceland

=== 2023 World Athletics Combined Events Tour ===
Silver

- January 28 & 29: Meeting X-Athletics Combined Events in (France) Aubiére
  - Heptathlon winner: (Switzerland) Simon Ehammer
  - Pentathlon winner: (France) Léonie Cambours
- February 4 & 5: Indoor Combined Events Tallinn 2023 in Estonia

=== 2023 World Athletics Continental Tour ===
Challenger

- January 21: Potts Classic in (New Zealand) Hastings
  - 100 m winners: (New Zealand) Tiaan Whelpton (m) / (New Zealand) Georgia Hulls (f)
  - 400 m winners: (New Zealand) Tommy Te Puni (m) / (New Zealand) Rosie Elliott (f)
  - 800 m winners: (New Zealand) James Preston (m) / (New Zealand) Holly Manning (f)
  - Long Jump winners: (New Zealand) Shay Veitch (m) / (New Zealand) Hannah Sandilands (f)
  - Pole Vault winners: (New Zealand) James Steyn (m) / (New Zealand) Eliza McCartney (f)
  - Discus Throw winners: (New Zealand) Connor Bell (m) / (United Kingdom) Jade Lally (f)
  - Hammer Throw winners: (New Zealand) Anthony Nobilo (m) / (New Zealand) Lauren Bruce (f)
  - Shot Put winners: (New Zealand) Nick Palmer (m) / (New Zealand) Maddi Wesche (f)
- January 28: Cooks Classic in (New Zealand) Wanganui
  - 200 m winners: (New Zealand) Tommy Te Puni (m) / (New Zealand) Portia Bing (f)
  - 400 m winners: (New Zealand) Fergus Mcleay (m) / (New Zealand) Rosie Elliott (f)
  - 400 m Hurdles winners: (New Zealand) Jonathan Maples (m) / (New Zealand) Grace Wisnewski (f)
  - Women's Hammer Throw winner: (New Zealand) Lauren Bruce
  - Men's Javelin Throw winner: (Wallis and Futuna) Felise Vaha'i Sosaia
  - High Jump winners: (New Zealand) Hamish Kerr (m) / (New Zealand) Imogen Skelton (f)
  - Long Jump winners: (New Zealand) Lewis Arthur (m) / (New Zealand) Hannah Sandilands (f)
  - Men's Shot Put winner: (New Zealand) Tom Walsh
- February 3: Capital Classic in (New Zealand) Wellington
  - 100 m winners: (New Zealand) Hamish Gill (m) / (New Zealand) Georgia Hulls (f)
  - 200 m winners: (New Zealand) Hamish Gill (m) / (New Zealand) Georgia Hulls (f)
  - 800 m winners: (New Zealand) James Ford (m) / (New Zealand) Holly Manning (f)
  - 110 m Hurdles winner: (New Zealand) Joshua Hawkins
  - Women's 100 m Hurdles winner: (New Zealand) Anna Percy
  - High Jump winners: (New Zealand) Rafe Coiuillault (m) / (New Zealand) Alice Taylor (f)
  - Triple Jump winners: (Australia) Ayo Ore (m) / (New Zealand) Anna Thomson (f)
  - Javelin Throw winners: (New Zealand) Douw Botes (m) / (New Zealand) Tori Peeters (f)
  - Hammer Throw winners: (New Zealand) Anthony Nobilo (m) / (New Zealand) Lauren Bruce (f)
  - Shot Put winners: (New Zealand) Tom Walsh (m) / (New Zealand) Natalia Rankin-Chitar (f)
- February 4: Sola Power Throwers Meeting in (New Zealand) Wellington
  - Discus Throw winners: (New Zealand) Jade Zaia (m) / (New Zealand) Natalia Rankin-Chitar (f)
  - Shot Put winners: (New Zealand) Nick Palmer (m) / (New Zealand) Natalia Rankin-Chitar (f)

=== 2022–23 World Athletics Race Walking Tour ===
Silver

- January 6: Supernova#1 in Australia
  - 10,000m Race Walk winners: (Australia) Declan Tingay (m) / (Australia) Jemima Montag (f)
- February 2: Supernova#2 in Australia
  - 10,000m Race Walk winners: (Australia) Declan Tingay (m) / (Australia) Jemima Montag (f)

Bronze

- October 22, 2022: Lusatian International Race-Walking Meeting in (Germany) Zittau
  - 5 km Race Walk winners: (Slovakia) Jakub Bátovský (m) / (Slovakia) Tamara Indrišková (f)
  - Women's 10 km Race Walk winner: (Germany) Sigute Brönnecke
  - 20 km Race Walk winners: (Germany) Carl Dohmann (m) / (Czech Republic) Martina Netolická (f)
  - 35 km Race Walk winners: (France) Kévin Campion (m) / (Germany) Bianca Schenker (f)
- December 18, 2022: Irish Open 20 km & 35 km Race Walking Ch. in (Republic of Ireland) Dublin
  - 20 km Race Walk winners: (Finland) Aku Partanen (m) / (Germany) Saskia Feige (f)
  - 35 km Race Walk winners: (France) Aurélien Quinion (m) / (Brazil) Mayara Vicentainer (f)
- January 1: 71st New Year Race Walk in (Japan) Tokyo
  - Men's 20 km Race Walk winner: (Japan) Yutaro Murayama
  - Women's 10 km Race Walk winner: (Japan) Miyu Naito
- January 15: USATF National 35 km Race Walk Ch. in (United States) Santee
  - Winners: (United States) Nick Christie (m) / (United States) Miranda Melville (f)

=== 2022–23 World Athletics Cross Country Tour ===
Gold

- October 15, 2022: Cardiff Cross Challenge in United Kingdom
  - Winners: (Kenya) Edward Zakayo (m) / (Kenya) Pamela Kosgei (f)
- October 23, 2022: Cross Country Bydgoszcz na Start in Poland
  - Winners: (Kenya) Levy Kibet (m) / (Kenya) Lucy Mawia (f)
- October 23, 2022: Cross Zornotza in (Spain) Amorebieta-Etxano
  - Winners: (Burundi) Rodrigue Kwizera (m) / (Spain) Isabel Barreiro (f)
- November 6, 2022: Cross Internacional de Soria in Spain
  - Winners: (Burundi) Thierry Ndikumwenayo (m) / (Kenya) Lucy Mawia (f)
- November 12–13, 2022: Cross de Atapuerca in Spain
  - Winners: (Burundi) Thierry Ndikumwenayo (m) / (Kenya) Beatrice Chebet (f)
- November 20, 2022: Cross Internacional de Itálica in (Spain) Sevilla
  - Winners: (Burundi) Thierry Ndikumwenayo (m) / (Turkey) Yasemin Can (f)
- November 27, 2022: Cross Internacional de la Constitución in (Spain) Alcobendas
  - Winners: (Burundi) Rodrigue Kwizera (m) / (Kenya) Lucy Mawia (f)
- December 1, 2022: Cross Champs in (United States) Austin
  - Winners: (Kenya) Edwin Kurgat (m) / (United States) Alicia Monson (f)
- December 18, 2022: Cross Internacional de Venta de Baños in Spain
  - Winners: (Burundi) Rodrigue Kwizera (m) / (Burundi) Francine Niyonsaba (f)
- January 6: 66° Campaccio in (Italy) San Giorgio su Legnano
  - Winners: (Burundi) Rodrigue Kwizera (m) / (Eritrea) Rahel Daniel (f)
- January 8: Juan Muguerza Cross-Country Race in (Spain) Elgoibar
  - Winners: (Ethiopia) Selemon Barega (m) / (Eritrea) Rahel Daniel (f)
- January 15: Cinque Mulini in (Italy) San Vittore Olona
  - Winners: (Kenya) Gideon Rono (m) / (Kenya) Beatrice Chebet (f)
- January 22: Lotto Cross Cup de Hannut in Belgium
  - Winners: (France) Yann Schrub (m) / (Eritrea) Rahel Daniel (f)
- January 28: Botswana Cross-Country Challenge in Gaborone
- February 5: Gran Premio Cáceres Campo a Través in (Spain) Calzadilla

Silver

- September 24, 2022: Lidingöloppet in (Sweden) Lidingö
  - Winners: (Sweden) Samuel Tsegay (m) / (Kenya) Sylvia Mboga Medugu (f)
- October 22, 2022: Northern Ireland International Cross Country in (United Kingdom) Belfast
  - Winners: (Ethiopia) Abeje Ayana (m) / (Ethiopia) Medina Eisa (f)
- October 30, 2022: Cross Cup van Mol in Belgium
  - Winners: (Uganda) Joel Ayeko (m) / (Sweden) Sarah Lahti (f)
- November 6, 2022: 65th Cross de San Sebastián in Spain
  - Winners: (Ethiopia) Addisu Yihune (m) / (Kenya) Purity Chepkirui (f)
- November 27, 2022: International Warandecross Tilburg in Netherlands
  - Winners: (Serbia) Elzan Bibić (m) / (Sweden) Sarah Lahti (f)

Bronze

- January 21: National Cross Country Nairobi in Kenya
  - Winners: (Kenya) Albert Kipkorir (m) / (Kenya) Esther Muthoni (f)

== See also ==
- 2023 in sports
  - 2023 in sports (B)
  - 2023 in sports (C–J)
  - 2023 in sports (K–S)
  - 2023 in sports (T–Z)
