= 2023 in sports (B) =

This page describes and summarizes the year 2023 in world sporting events for sports starting with the letter "B".

== Badminton ==
=== International badminton championships ===
- February 10–19: 2023 Oceania Badminton Championships in (New Zealand) North Shore
  - Team: Australia
- February 13–19: 2023 African Badminton Championships in (South Africa) Johannesburg
  - Team: Egypt def. Mauritius, 3–2.
- February 14–18: 2023 European Mixed Team Badminton Championships in Aire-sur-la-Lys
  - Denmark def. France, 3–2.
- February 14–19: 2023 Badminton Asia Mixed Team Championships in (United Arab Emirates) Dubai
  - China def. South Korea, 3–1.
- April 25–30: 2023 Badminton Asia Championships in (United Arab Emirates) Dubai
  - Men's singles: (Indonesia) Anthony Sinisuka Ginting def. (Singapore) Loh Kean Yew, 21–12, 21–8.
  - Women's singles: (Chinese Taipei) Tai Tzu-ying def. (South Korea) An Se-young, 21–10, 21–14.
  - Men's doubles: (India) Satwiksairaj Rankireddy & (India) Chirag Shetty def. (Malaysia) Ong Yew Sin & (Malaysia) Teo Ee Yi, 16–21, 21–17, 21–19.
  - Women's doubles: (Japan) Yuki Fukushima & (Japan) Sayaka Hirota def. (South Korea) Baek Ha-na & (South Korea) Lee So-hee, 21–7, 21–14.
  - Mixed doubles: (China) Jiang Zhenbang & (China) Wei Yaxin def. (China) Zheng Siwei & (China) Huang Yaqiong, 21–15, 21–16.
- May 14–21: 2023 Sudirman Cup in Suzhou
  - China def. South Korea, 3–0.
- August 21–27: 2023 BWF World Championships in (Denmark) Copenhagen
  - Men's singles: (Thailand) Kunlavut Vitidsarn def. (Japan) Kodai Naraoka, 19–21, 21–18, 21–7.
  - Women's singles: (South Korea) An Se-young def. (Spain) Carolina Marín, 21–12, 21–10.
  - Men's doubles: (India) Kang Min-hyuk & (South Korea) Seo Seung-jae def. (Denmark) Kim Astrup & (Denmark) Anders Skaarup Rasmussen, 14–21, 21–15, 21–17.
  - Women's doubles: (China) Chen Qingchen & (China) Jia Yifan def. (Indonesia) Apriyani Rahayu & (Indonesia) Siti Fadia Silva Ramadhanti, 21–16, 21–12.
  - Mixed doubles: (South Korea) Seo Seung-jae & (South Korea) Chae Yoo-jung def. (China) Zheng Siwei & (China) Huang Yaqiong, 21–17, 10–21, 21–18.
- September 11–17: 2023 BWF World Senior Championships in (South Korea) Jeonju
- October 2–15: 2023 BWF World Junior Championships in (United States) Spokane
- December 13–17: 2023 BWF World Tour Finals in (China) Hangzhou

=== BWF World Tour Super 1000 ===
- January 10–15: 2023 Malaysia Open in Kuala Lumpur
  - Men's singles: (Denmark) Viktor Axelsen def. (Japan) Kodai Naraoka, 21–6, 21–15.
  - Women's singles: (Japan) Akane Yamaguchi def. (South Korea) An Se-young, 12–21, 21–19, 21–11.
  - Men's doubles: (Indonesia) Fajar Alfian & (Indonesia) Muhammad Rian Ardianto def. (China) Liang Weikeng & (China) Wang Chang, 21–18, 18–21, 21–13.
  - Women's doubles: (China) Chen Qingchen & (China) Jia Yifan def. (South Korea) Baek Ha-na & (South Korea) Lee Yu-lim, 21–16, 21–10.
  - Mixed doubles: (China) Zheng Siwei & (China) Huang Yaqiong def. (Japan) Yuta Watanabe & (Japan) Arisa Higashino, 21–19, 21–11.
- March 14–19: 2023 All England Open in Birmingham
  - Men's singles: (China) Li Shifeng def. (China) Shi Yuqi, 26–24, 21–5.
  - Women's singles: (South Korea) An Se-young def. (China) Chen Yufei, 21–17, 10–21, 21–19.
  - Men's doubles: (Indonesia) Fajar Alfian & (Indonesia) Muhammad Rian Ardianto def. (Indonesia) Mohammad Ahsan & (Indonesia) Hendra Setiawan, 21–17, 21–14.
  - Women's doubles: (South Korea) Kim So-yeong & (South Korea) Kong Hee-yong def. (South Korea) Baek Ha-na & (South Korea) Lee So-hee, 21–5, 21–12.
  - Mixed doubles: (China) Zheng Siwei & (China) Huang Yaqiong def. (South Korea) Seo Seung-jae & (South Korea) Chae Yoo-jung, 21–16, 16–21, 21–12.
- June 13–18: 2023 Indonesia Open in Jakarta
  - Men's singles: (Denmark) Viktor Axelsen def. (Indonesia) Anthony Sinisuka Ginting, 21–14, 21–13.
  - Women's singles: (China) Chen Yufei def. (Spain) Carolina Marín, 21–18, 21–19.
  - Men's doubles: (India) Satwiksairaj Rankireddy & (India) Chirag Shetty def. (Malaysia) Aaron Chia & (Malaysia) Soh Wooi Yik, 21–17, 21–18.
  - Women's doubles: (South Korea) Baek Ha-na & (South Korea) Lee So-hee def. (Japan) Yuki Fukushima & (Japan) Sayaka Hirota, 22–20, 21–10.
  - Mixed doubles: (China) Zheng Siwei & (China) Huang Yaqiong def. (Japan) Yuta Watanabe & (Japan) Arisa Higashino, 21–14, 21–11.
- September 5–10: 2023 China Open in Changzhou

=== BWF World Tour Super 750 ===
- January 17–22: 2023 India Open in New Delhi
  - Men's singles: (Thailand) Kunlavut Vitidsarn def. (Denmark) Viktor Axelsen, 22–20, 10–21, 21–12.
  - Women's singles: (South Korea) An Se-young def. (Japan) Akane Yamaguchi, 15–21, 21–16, 21–12.
  - Men's doubles: (China) Liang Weikeng & (China) Wang Chang def. (Malaysia) Aaron Chia & (Malaysia) Soh Wooi Yik, 14–21, 21–19, 21–18.
  - Women's doubles: (Japan) Nami Matsuyama & (Japan) Chiharu Shida def. (China) Chen Qingchen & (China) Jia Yifan, walkover.
  - Mixed doubles: (Japan) Yuta Watanabe & (Japan) Arisa Higashino def. (China) Wang Yilyu & (China) Huang Dongping, walkover.
- June 6–11: 2023 Singapore Open in Singapore
  - Men's singles: (Indonesia) Anthony Sinisuka Ginting def. (Denmark) Anders Antonsen, 21–16, 21–13.
  - Women's singles: (South Korea) An Se-young def. (Japan) Akane Yamaguchi, 21–16, 21–14.
  - Men's doubles: (Japan) Takuro Hoki & (Japan) Yugo Kobayashi def. (China) Liang Weikeng & (China) Wang Chang, 21–13, 21–18.
  - Women's doubles: (China) Chen Qingchen & (China) Jia Yifan def. (South Korea) Baek Ha-na & (South Korea) Lee So-hee, 21–16, 21–12.
  - Mixed doubles: (Denmark) Mathias Christiansen & (Denmark) Alexandra Bøje def. (Japan) Yuta Watanabe & (Japan) Arisa Higashino, 21–14, 20–22, 21–16.
- July 25–30: 2023 Japan Open in Tokyo
  - Men's singles: (Denmark) Viktor Axelsen def. (Indonesia) Jonatan Christie, 21–7, 21–18.
  - Women's singles: (South Korea) An Se-young def. (China) He Bingjiao, 21–15, 21–11.
  - Men's doubles: (Chinese Taipei) Lee Yang & (Chinese Taipei) Wang Chi-lin def. (Japan) Takuro Hoki & (Japan) Yugo Kobayashi, 21–19, 21–13.
  - Women's doubles: (South Korea) Kim So-yeong & (South Korea) Kong Hee-yong def. (China) Chen Qingchen & (China) Jia Yifan, 21–17, 21–14.
  - Mixed doubles: (Japan) Yuta Watanabe & (Japan) Arisa Higashino def. (Thailand) Dechapol Puavaranukroh & (Thailand) Sapsiree Taerattanachai, 17–21, 21–16, 21–15.
- October 17–22: 2023 Denmark Open in Odense
- October 24–29: 2023 French Open in (France) Paris
- November 21–26: 2023 China Masters in Shenzhen

=== BWF World Tour Super 500 ===
- January 24–29: 2023 Indonesia Masters in Jakarta
  - Men's singles: (Indonesia) Jonatan Christie def. (Indonesia) Chico Aura Dwi Wardoyo, 21–15, 21–13.
  - Women's singles: (South Korea) An Se-young def. (Spain) Carolina Marín, 18–21, 21–18, 21–13.
  - Men's doubles: (Indonesia) Leo Rolly Carnando & (Indonesia) Daniel Marthin def. (China) He Jiting & (China) Zhou Haodong, 21–17, 21–16.
  - Women's doubles: (China) Liu Shengshu & (China) Zhang Shuxian def. (Japan) Yuki Fukushima & (Japan) Sayaka Hirota, 22–20, 21–19.
  - Mixed doubles: (China) Feng Yanzhe & (China) Huang Dongping def. (China) Jiang Zhenbang & (China) Wei Yaxin, 21–15, 16–21, 21–19.
- May 23–28: 2023 Malaysia Masters in Kuala Lumpur
  - Men's singles: (India) Prannoy H. S. def. (China) Weng Hongyang, 21–19, 13–21, 21–18.
  - Women's singles: (Japan) Akane Yamaguchi def. (Indonesia) Gregoria Mariska Tunjung, 21–17, 21–7.
  - Men's doubles: (South Korea) Kang Min-hyuk & (South Korea) Seo Seung-jae def. (Malaysia) Man Wei Chong & (Malaysia) Tee Kai Wun, 21–15, 22–24, 21–19.
  - Women's doubles: (South Korea) Baek Ha-na & (South Korea) Lee So-hee def. (Malaysia) Pearly Tan & (Malaysia) Thinaah Muralitharan, 22–20, 8–21, 21–17.
  - Mixed doubles: (Thailand) Dechapol Puavaranukroh & (Thailand) Sapsiree Taerattanachai def. (China) Feng Yanzhe & (China) Huang Dongping, 16–21, 21–13, 21–18.
- May 30 – June 4: 2023 Thailand Open in Bangkok
  - Men's singles: (Thailand) Kunlavut Vitidsarn def. (Hong Kong) Lee Cheuk Yiu, 21–12, 21–10.
  - Women's singles: (South Korea) An Se-young def. (China) He Bingjiao, 21–10, 21–19.
  - Men's doubles: (China) Liang Weikeng & (China) Wang Chang def. (Indonesia) Bagas Maulana & (Indonesia) Muhammad Shohibul Fikri, 21–10, 21–15.
  - Women's doubles: (South Korea) Kim So-yeong & (South Korea) Kong Hee-yong def. (Thailand) Benyapa Aimsaard & (Thailand) Nuntakarn Aimsaard, 21–13, 21–17.
  - Mixed doubles: (Thailand) Kim Won-ho & (Thailand) Jeong Na-eun def. (Thailand) Dechapol Puavaranukroh & (Thailand) Sapsiree Taerattanachai, 11–21, 21–19, 22–20.
- July 4–9: 2023 Canada Open in Calgary
  - Men's singles: (India) Lakshya Sen def. (China) Li Shifeng, 21–18, 22–20.
  - Women's singles: (Japan) Akane Yamaguchi def. (Thailand) Ratchanok Intanon, 21–19, 21–16.
  - Men's doubles: (Denmark) Kim Astrup & (Denmark) Anders Skaarup Rasmussen def. (Denmark) Rasmus Kjær & (Denmark) Frederik Søgaard, 23–25, 21–16, 21–12.
  - Women's doubles: (Japan) Nami Matsuyama & (Japan) Chiharu Shida def. (Japan) Mayu Matsumoto & (Japan) Wakana Nagahara, 22–20, 21–16.
  - Mixed doubles: (Japan) Hiroki Midorikawa & (Japan) Natsu Saito def. (Denmark) Mathias Thyrri & (Denmark) Amalie Magelund, 21–17, 16–21, 21–13.
- July 18–23: 2023 Korea Open in (South Korea) Yeosu
  - Men's singles: (Denmark) Anders Antonsen def. (Singapore) Loh Kean Yew, 11–21, 21–11, 21–19.
  - Women's singles: (South Korea) An Se-young def. (Chinese Taipei) Tai Tzu-ying, 21–9, 21–15.
  - Men's doubles: (India) Satwiksairaj Rankireddy & (India) Chirag Shetty def. (Indonesia) Fajar Alfian & (Indonesia) Muhammad Rian Ardianto, 17–21, 21–13, 21–14.
  - Women's doubles: (China) Chen Qingchen & (China) Jia Yifan def. (South Korea) Kim So-yeong & (South Korea) Kong Hee-yong, 21–10, 17–21, 21–7.
  - Mixed doubles: (China) Feng Yanzhe & (China) Huang Dongping def. (China) Jiang Zhenbang & (China) Wei Yaxin, 21–16, 21–13.
- August 1–6: 2023 Australian Open in (Australia) Sydney
- September 12–17: 2023 Hong Kong Open in Kowloon
- October 10–15: 2023 Finnish Open in (Finland) Vantaa
- November 14–19: 2023 Japan Masters in Kumamoto

=== BWF World Tour Super 300 ===
- January 31 – February 5: 2023 Thailand Masters in Bangkok
  - Men's singles: (Chinese Taipei) Lin Chun-yi def. (Hong Kong) Ng Ka Long, 21–17, 21–14.
  - Women's singles: (China) Zhang Yiman def. (China) Han Yue, 15–21, 21–13, 21–18.
  - Men's doubles: (Indonesia) Leo Rolly Carnando & (Indonesia) Daniel Marthin def. (Chinese Taipei) Su Ching-heng & (Chinese Taipei) Ye Hong-wei, 21–16, 21–17.
  - Women's doubles: (Thailand) Benyapa Aimsaard & (Thailand) Nuntakarn Aimsaard def. (South Korea) Baek Ha-na & (South Korea) Lee So-hee, 21–6, 21–11.
  - Mixed doubles: (China) Feng Yanzhe & (China) Huang Dongping def. (South Korea) Seo Seung-jae & (South Korea) Chae Yoo-jung, 18–21, 21–15, 21–12.
- March 7–12: 2023 German Open in (Germany) Mülheim
  - Men's singles: (Hong Kong) Ng Ka Long def. (China) Li Shifeng, 20–22, 21–18, 21–18.
  - Women's singles: (Japan) Akane Yamaguchi def. (South Korea) An Se-young, 21–11, 21–14.
  - Men's doubles: (South Korea) Choi Sol-gyu & (South Korea) Kim Won-ho def. (South Korea) Kang Min-hyuk & (South Korea) Seo Seung-jae, 21–19, 18–21, 21–19.
  - Women's doubles: (South Korea) Baek Ha-na & (South Korea) Lee So-hee def. (Japan) Nami Matsuyama & (Japan) Chiharu Shida, 21–19, 21–15.
  - Mixed doubles: (China) Feng Yanzhe & (China) Huang Dongping def. (South Korea) Kim Won-ho & (South Korea) Jeong Na-eun, 21–4, 21–15.
- March 21–26: 2023 Swiss Open in (Switzerland) Basel
  - Men's singles: (Japan) Koki Watanabe def. (Chinese Taipei) Chou Tien-chen, 22–20, 18–21, 21–12.
  - Women's singles: (Thailand) Pornpawee Chochuwong def. (Denmark) Mia Blichfeldt, 21–16, 21–18.
  - Men's doubles: (India) Satwiksairaj Rankireddy & (India) Chirag Shetty def. (China) Ren Xiangyu & (China) Tan Qiang, 21–19, 24–22.
  - Women's doubles: (Japan) Rena Miyaura & (Japan) Ayako Sakuramoto def. (Japan) Yuki Fukushima & (Japan) Sayaka Hirota, walkover.
  - Mixed doubles: (China) Jiang Zhenbang & (China) Wei Yaxin def. (Malaysia) Goh Soon Huat & (Malaysia) Shevon Jemie Lai, 21–17, 19–21, 21–17.
- March 28 – April 2: 2023 Spain Masters in Madrid
  - Men's singles: (Japan) Kenta Nishimoto def. (Japan) Kanta Tsuneyama, 15–21, 21–18, 21–19.
  - Women's singles: (Indonesia) Gregoria Mariska Tunjung def. (India) P. V. Sindhu, 21–8, 21–8.
  - Men's doubles: (China) He Jiting & (China) Zhou Haodong def. (Chinese Taipei) Lee Fang-chih & (Chinese Taipei) Lee Fang-jen, 21–5, 21–12.
  - Women's doubles: (China) Liu Shengshu & (China) Tan Ning def. (China) Chen Fanghui & (China) Du Yue, 21–8, 16–21, 21–18.
  - Mixed doubles: (Denmark) Mathias Christiansen & (Denmark) Alexandra Bøje def. (Indonesia) Praveen Jordan & (Indonesia) Melati Daeva Oktavianti, 22–20, 21–18.
- April 4–9: 2023 Orléans Masters in (France) Orléans
  - Men's singles: (India) Priyanshu Rajawat def. (Denmark) Magnus Johannesen, 21–15, 19–21, 21–16.
  - Women's singles: (Spain) Carolina Marín def. (United States) Beiwen Zhang, 25–23, 9–21, 21–10.
  - Men's doubles: (China) Chen Boyang & (China) Liu Yi def. (Indonesia) Muhammad Shohibul Fikri & (Indonesia) Bagas Maulana, 21–19, 21–17.
  - Women's doubles: (Japan) Rena Miyaura & (Japan) Ayako Sakuramoto def. (China) Liu Shengshu & (China) Tan Ning, 21–19, 16–21, 21–12.
  - Mixed doubles: (Malaysia) Chen Tang Jie & (Malaysia) Toh Ee Wei def. (Chinese Taipei) Ye Hong-wei & (Chinese Taipei) Lee Chia-hsin, 21–19, 21–17.
- June 20–25: 2023 Taipei Open in (Taiwan) Taipei
  - Men's singles: (Indonesia) Chico Aura Dwi Wardoyo def. (Chinese Taipei) Su Li-yang, 23–21, 21–15.
  - Women's singles: (Chinese Taipei) Tai Tzu-ying def. (United States) Beiwen Zhang, 21–14, 21–17.
  - Men's doubles: (Malaysia) Man Wei Chong & (Malaysia) Tee Kai Wun def. (Chinese Taipei) Lu Ching-yao & (Chinese Taipei) Yang Po-han, 20–22, 21–17, 21–14.
  - Women's doubles: (South Korea) Lee Yu-lim & (South Korea) Shin Seung-chan def. (Indonesia) Febriana Dwipuji Kusuma & (Indonesia) Amalia Cahaya Pratiwi, 18–21, 21–17, 21–17.
  - Mixed doubles: (Malaysia) Chen Tang Jie & (Malaysia) Toh Ee Wei def. (Chinese Taipei) Chiu Hsiang-chieh & (Chinese Taipei) Lin Xiao-min, 21–12, 21–8.
- July 11–16: 2023 U.S. Open in (United States) Council Bluffs, Iowa
  - Men's singles: (China) Li Shifeng def. (Thailand) Kunlavut Vitidsarn, 21–15, 21–18.
  - Women's singles: (Thailand) Supanida Katethong def. (China) Gao Fangjie, 21–15, 21–16.
  - Men's doubles: (Malaysia) Goh Sze Fei & (Malaysia) Nur Izzuddin def. (Chinese Taipei) Lee Fang-chih & (Chinese Taipei) Lee Fang-jen, 21–9, 21–10.
  - Women's doubles: (China) Liu Shengshu & (China) Tan Ning def. (Denmark) Maiken Fruergaard & (Denmark) Sara Thygesen, 21–19, 21–19.
  - Mixed doubles: (Chinese Taipei) Ye Hong-wei & (Chinese Taipei) Lee Chia-hsin def. (Denmark) Mathias Thyrri & (Denmark) Amalie Magelund, 13–21, 21–6, 21–18.
- October 31 – November 5: 2023 Hylo Open in (Germany) Saarbrücken
  - Men's singles: (Chinese Taipei) Chou Tien-chen def. (Hong Kong) Lee Cheuk Yiu, 21–23, 21–17, 21–10.
  - Women's singles: (United States) Beiwen Zhang def. (China) Line Kjærsfeldt, 21–18, 16–21, 21–16.
  - Men's doubles: (China) Liu Yuchen & (China) Ou Xuanyi def. (Chinese Taipei) Lee Yang & (Chinese Taipei) Wang Chi-lin, 24–22, 21–13.
  - Women's doubles: (China) Zhang Shuxian & (China) Zheng Yu def. (Indonesia) Apriyani Rahayu & (Indonesia) Siti Fadia Silva Ramadhanti, 21–18, 1–1, retired.
  - Mixed doubles: (Hong Kong) Tang Chun Man & (Hong Kong) Tse Ying Suet def. (Indonesia) Rehan Naufal Kusharjanto & (Indonesia) Lisa Ayu Kusumawati, 15–21, 21–15, 21–14.
- November 7–12: 2023 Korea Masters in (South Korea) Gwangju
  - Men's singles: (Japan) Kento Momota def. (Japan) Koki Watanabe, 21–16, 21–15.
  - Women's singles: (South Korea) Kim Ga-eun def. (Japan) Tomoka Miyazaki, 19–21, 21–17, 21–12.
  - Men's doubles: (Chinese Taipei) Lee Jhe-huei & (Chinese Taipei) Yang Po-hsuan def. (Chinese Taipei) Lee Yang & (Chinese Taipei) Wang Chi-lin, 21–17, 21–19.
  - Women's doubles: (South Korea) Jeong Na-eun & (South Korea) Kim Hye-jeong def. (Japan) Rui Hirokami & (Japan) Yuna Kato, 21–12, 21–19.
  - Mixed doubles: (South Korea) Seo Seung-jae & (South Korea) Chae Yoo-jung def. (China) Jiang Zhenbang & (China) Wei Yaxin, 21–14, 21–15.
- November 28 – December 3: 2023 Syed Modi International in (India) Lucknow
  - Men's singles: (Chinese Taipei) Chi Yu-jen def. (Japan) Kenta Nishimoto, 20–22, 21–12, 21–17.
  - Women's singles: (Japan) Nozomi Okuhara def. (Denmark) Line Kjærsfeldt, 21–19, 21–16.
  - Men's doubles: (Malaysia) Choong Hon Jian & (Malaysia) Muhammad Haikal def. (Japan) Akira Koga & (Japan) Taichi Saito, 18–21, 21–18, 21–16.
  - Women's doubles: (Japan) Rin Iwanaga & (Japan) Kie Nakanishi def. (India) Tanisha Crasto & (India) Ashwini Ponnappa, 21–14, 17–21, 21–15.
  - Mixed doubles: (Indonesia) Dejan Ferdinansyah & (Indonesia) Gloria Emanuelle Widjaja def. (Japan) Yuki Kaneko & (Japan) Misaki Matsutomo, 21–14, 21–15.

=== BWF World Tour Super 100 ===
- March 14–19: 2023 Ruichang China Masters in Ruichang
  - Men's singles: (China) Sun Feixiang def. (China) Sun Chao, 21–15, 21–14.
  - Women's singles: (Chinese Taipei) Lin Hsiang-ti def. (China) Chen Lu, 13–21, 21–11, 22–20.
  - Men's doubles: (China) Chen Boyang & (China) Liu Yi def. (Malaysia) Nur Izzuddin & (Malaysia) Muhammad Haikal, 21–16, 19–21, 23–21.
  - Women's doubles: (China) Chen Xiaofei & (China) Feng Xueying def. (China) Keng Shuliang & (China) Zhang Chi, 21–15, 21–19.
  - Mixed doubles: (China) Jiang Zhenbang & (China) Wei Yaxin def. (China) Cheng Xing & (China) Chen Fanghui, 21–15, 21–8.

== Baseball & Softball ==
=== WBSC ===
- April 15–23: 2023 U-23 Men's Softball World Cup in (Argentina) Paraná (debut event)
- July 28 – August 6: 2023 U-12 Baseball World Cup in (Taiwan) Tainan
- October 19–30: 2023 U-15 Women's Softball World Cup in (Japan) Tokyo (debut event)
- TBA: 2023 U-18 Baseball World Cup (location TBA)
- TBA: 2023 U-18 Men's Softball World Cup (location TBA)

=== Major League Baseball ===
- March 30 – October 1: 2023 Major League Baseball season
- July 9: – 2023 Major League Baseball draft in (Washington (state)) Seattle
- July 11: 2023 Major League Baseball All-Star Game at T-Mobile Park in (Washington (state)) Seattle
- October 27 – November 1: 2023 World Series
  - The Texas Rangers defeat the Arizona Diamondbacks, 4–1 in games played, to win their first World Series title.

=== 2023 Little League World Series ===
- July 29 – August 5: 2023 Senior League World Series at J.B. Red Owens Sports Complex in (South Carolina) Easley
- July 30 – August 5: 2023 Junior League Softball World Series at Everest Park in (Washington (state)) Kirkland
- July 30 – August 6: 2023 Intermediate League World Series at Max Baer Park in (California) Livermore
- July 31 – August 6: 2023 Senior League Softball World Series at Lower Sussex Little League Complex in (Delaware) Roxana
- August 9–15: 2023 Little League Softball World Series at Stallings Stadium in (North Carolina) Greenville
- August 13–20: 2023 Junior League World Series at Heritage Park in (Michigan) Taylor
- August 16–27: 2023 Little League World Series at both Little League Volunteer Stadium and Howard J. Lamade Stadium in (Pennsylvania) South Williamsport

== Basketball ==
=== FIBA World & Intercontinental Cups ===
- June 24 – July 2: 2023 FIBA Under-19 Basketball World Cup in (Hungary) Debrecen
- July 15–23: 2023 FIBA Under-19 Women's Basketball World Cup in (Spain) Madrid
- August 25 – September 10: 2023 FIBA Basketball World Cup in the (Philippines) Manila, (Japan) Okinawa, and (Indonesia) Jakarta
- TBA: 2023 FIBA Intercontinental Cup (location TBA)

=== FIBA Africa ===
- July 28 – August 5: 2023 Women's Afrobasket in (Rwanda) Kigali
- July 13–23: 2023 FIBA Under-16 African Championship in (Tunisia) Jemmal and Monastir
- July 13–22: 2023 FIBA U16 Women's African Championship in (Tunisia) Jemmal and Monastir
- March 11 – May 27: 2023 BAL season
- TBA: 2023 FIBA Africa Women's Champions Cup (location TBA)

=== FIBA Americas ===
- July 1–9: 2023 FIBA Women's AmeriCup in (Mexico) León
- TBA: 2023 FIBA Under-16 Americas Championship (location TBA)
- TBA: 2023 FIBA Under-16 Women's Americas Championship (location TBA)
- TBA: 2022–23 BCL Americas
- TBA: 2023 Liga Sudamericana de Básquetbol

=== FIBA Asia ===
- June 26 – July 2: 2023 FIBA Women's Asia Cup in (Australia) Sydney
- September 17–24: 2023 FIBA U16 Asian Championship in Qatar
- TBA: 2023 FIBA U16 Women's Asian Championship (location TBA)

Clubs competitions

- January 2 – March 15: 2023 ABL season
- December 19, 2022 – May 2023: 2022–23 West Asia Super League

=== FIBA Europe ===
- June 15–25: EuroBasket Women 2023 in (Israel) Tel Aviv and (Slovenia) Ljubljana
- TBA: 2023 FIBA European Championship for Small Countries (location TBA)
- TBA: 2023 FIBA Women's European Championship for Small Countries (location TBA)
- July 8–16: 2023 FIBA U20 European Championship in (Greece) Heraklion
- July 22–30: 2023 FIBA U18 European Championship in (Serbia) Niš
- August 5–13: 2023 FIBA U16 European Championship in (North Macedonia) Skopje
- July 29 – August 6: 2023 FIBA U20 Women's European Championship in (Lithuania) Klaipėda and Vilnius
- July 1–9: 2023 FIBA U18 Women's European Championship in (Turkey) Konya
- August 11–19: 2023 FIBA U16 Women's European Championship in (Turkey) İzmir

Clubs competitions

- October 6, 2022 –: 2022–23 EuroLeague
- September 21, 2022 – May 14: 2022–23 Basketball Champions League
- October 11, 2022 – May: 2022–23 EuroCup Basketball
- September 27, 2022 – April 26: 2022–23 FIBA Europe Cup
- September 21, 2022 –: 2022–23 EuroLeague Women
- October 5, 2022 –: 2022–23 EuroCup Women
- October 28, 2022 –: 2022–23 European Women's Basketball League
- September 30, 2022 –: 2022–23 ABA League First Division
- October 2022 –: 2022–23 ABA League Second Division
- September 30, 2022 –: 2022–23 BNXT League
- September 30, 2022 –: 2022–23 Latvian–Estonian Basketball League
- November 22, 2022 –: 2022–23 European North Basketball League
- October 27, 2022 –: 2022–23 BIBL season
- October 8, 2022 –: 2022–23 Baltic Women's Basketball League

=== National Basketball Association ===
- October 18, 2022 – April 9, 2023: 2022–23 NBA season
- February 19: 2023 NBA All-Star Game at the Vivint Arena in Salt Lake City
  - All-Star Game: Team Giannis defeats Team LeBron 184 – 175.
  - Skills Challenge: Team Jazz (Jordan Clarkson, Walker Kessler, Collin Sexton) (Utah)
  - Three Point Contest: Damian Lillard (Portland)
  - Slam Dunk Contest: Mac McClung (Philadelphia)
- April 15 – June 12: 2023 NBA playoffs (Colorado) Denver Nuggets defeated (Florida) Miami Heat 4–1 in the 2023 NBA Finals
- June 22: 2023 NBA draft
- November 3 – December 9: 2023 NBA In-Season Tournament (California) Los Angeles Lakers defeated Indiana Pacers 123–109 in the 2023 NBA In-Season Tournament championship game

=== National Collegiate Athletic Association ===
- March 14 – April 2: 2023 NCAA Division I men's basketball tournament
- March 17 – April 3: 2023 NCAA Division I women's basketball tournament

== Beach soccer ==
UEFA

- June 9–18: 2023 Euro Winners Cup in Portugal
  - In the final, (Israel) Kfar Qassem defeated (Italy) Pisa 2014 2–2 (5–3 in a penalty shoot-out) to win the title.
- June 12–18: 2023 Women's Euro Winners Cup in Portugal
  - In the final, (Spain) Higicontrol Melilla defeated (Poland) FC10 Ladies 3–1 to win the title.
- July 2–9: 2023 FIFA Beach Soccer World Cup qualification (UEFA) in Azerbaijan
  - Belarus, Portugal, Ukraine, and Italy qualified for the World Cup
- September 19–24: 2023 Euro Beach Soccer League in Italy
  - In the final, Italy defeated Spain 5–4 to win the title.

CONMEBOL

- March 11–19: 2023 Copa América de Beach Soccer in Argentina
  - In the final, Brazil defeated Argentina 13–5 to win the title.
- June 18–25: 2022 Copa Libertadores de Beach Soccer in Chile
  - In the final, (Paraguay) Presidente Hayes defeated (Brazil) Sampaio Corrêa 6–5 to win the title.
- August 5–13: South American Under-20 Beach Soccer Championship in Chile
  - In the final, Paraguay defeated Brazil 5–3 to win the title.
- December 3–10: 2023 Copa Libertadores de Fútbol Playa in Paraguay
  - In the final, (Paraguay) San Antonio defeated (Paraguay) Presidente Hayes 3–1 to win the title.
- TBA: 2023 FIFA Beach Soccer World Cup qualification (CONMEBOL) (location TBA)

AFC

- March 16–26: 2023 AFC Beach Soccer Asian Cup in Thailand
  - In the final, Iran defeated Japan 6–0 to win the title.

CONCACAF

- February 6–12: 2023 Americas Winners Cup in El Salvador
- May 8–14: 2023 CONCACAF Beach Soccer Championship in Bahamas
  - In the final, United States defeated Mexico 5–0 to win the title.

OFC

- August 21–26: 2023 OFC Beach Soccer Nations Cup in Tahiti

Beach Soccer Worldwide

- TBA: 2023 Beach Soccer Intercontinental Cup in (United Arab Emirates) Dubai
- TBA: 2023 BSWW Mundialito (location TBA)

== Beach volleyball ==
=== BV World Championships ===
- October 6–15: 2023 Beach Volleyball World Championships in (Mexico) Tlaxcala
- November 8–12: 2023 FIVB Beach Volleyball U21 World Championships in Thailand (location TBA)

=== BV Continental Championships ===
European Volleyball Confederation (BV)

- July 26–29: 2023 European U22 Beach Volleyball Championships in (Romania) Timișoara
- August 10–13: 2023 European U20 Beach Volleyball Championships in (Latvia) Riga
- August 24–27: 2023 European U18 Beach Volleyball Championships in (Spain) Madrid

Asian Volleyball Confederation (BV)

- July 13–16: 2023 Asian U21 Beach Volleyball Championships in Thailand (location TBA)

=== 2023 Volleyball World Beach Pro Tour ===
- January 26–29: 2022 Volleyball World Beach Pro Tour Finals in (Qatar) Doha
  - Men's winners: Norway (Anders Mol & Christian Sørum)
  - Women's winners: United States (Sara Hughes & Kelly Claes)
- December 7–10: 2023 Volleyball World Beach Pro Tour Finals in (Qatar) Doha

Elite 16

- February 1–5: BV Elite 16 #1 in (Qatar) Doha
- March 22–26: BV Elite 16 #2 in (Mexico) Tepic
- April 26–30: BV Elite #3 in (Brazil) Uberlândia
- May 31 – June 4: BV Elite #4 in (Czech Republic) Ostrava
- July 5–9: BV Elite 16 #5 in (Switzerland) Gstaad
- July 26–30: BV Elite 16 #6 in (Canada) Montreal
- August 16–20: BV Elite 16 #7 in (Germany) Hamburg
- September 27 – October 1: BV Elite 16 #8 in (France) Paris
- November 1–5: BV Elite 16 #9 in (South Africa) Cape Town
- November 8–12: BV Elite 16 #10 in (United Arab Emirates) Dubai
- November 22–26: BV Elite 16 #11 in Australia (location TBA)

Challenge

- March 16–19: BV Challenge #1 in (Mexico) La Paz
- April 6–9: BV Challenge #2 in (Brazil) Itapema
- April 13–16: BV Challenge #3 in (Brazil) Saquarema
- June 15–18: BV Challenge #4 in (Latvia) Jūrmala
- July 13–16: BV Challenge #5 in Portugal (location TBA)
- July 20–23: BV Challenge #6 in (Canada) Edmonton
- October 26–29: BV Challenge #7 in the Maldives (location TBA)
- November 2–5: BV Challenge #8 in (China) Hainan
- November 30 – December 2: BV Challenge #9 in the Philippines (location TBA)

=== 2023 South American Beach Volleyball Circuit ===
  - January 20–22: 1st Round in (Chile) Rancagua
  - Men's winners: (Chile) Marco Grimalt & Esteban Grimalt
  - Women's winners: (Brazil) Tainá Silva Bigi & Victória Tosta

== Boccia ==
=== Boccia World Championships ===
- July 7–16: 2023 World Boccia Youth Championships in (Portugal) Vila do Conde

=== Continental/Regional Championships ===
- May 14–22: 2023 World Boccia Asia-Oceania Regional Championships in Hong Kong
- July 2–10: 2023 World Boccia Africa Regional Championships in (Egypt) Cairo
- August 6–14: 2023 World Boccia Europe Regional Championships in (Netherlands) Rotterdam

== Bowling ==
=== 2023 PBA Tour ===
Major events

- January 30 – February 4: 2023 U.S. Open in (United States) Indianapolis
  - Winner: (United States) E. J. Tackett
- March 17–19: 2023 PBA Tournament of Champions in (United States) Fairlawn
  - Winner: (Australia) Jason Belmonte
- March 26–31: 2023 USBC Masters in (United States) Allen Park
  - Winner: (United States) Anthony Simonsen
- April 9–23: 2023 PBA World Championship in (United States) Wauwatosa
  - Winner: (United States) E. J. Tackett
- April 30 – May 14: 2023 PBA Players Championship in (United States) North Brunswick
  - Winner: (United States) Kevin McCune

== Bowls ==
- January 6–22: 2023 World Indoor Bowls Championship in (England) Hopton-on-Sea
  - Men's singles winner: (England) Jamie Walker
  - Women's singles winner: (England) Katherine Rednall
  - Open U25 winner: (Scotland) Daniel Pool
  - Open pairs winners: (England) Nick Brett & (England) Greg Harlow
  - Mixed pairs winners: (Wales) Ceri Ann Glen & (Scotland) Stewart Anderson

== Boxing ==
=== IBA World Boxing Championships ===
- March 15–31: 2023 IBA Women's World Boxing Championships in (India) New Delhi
- May 1–14: 2023 IBA Men's World Boxing Championships in (Uzbekistan) Tashkent

=== Continental Boxing Championships ===
- January 16–27: 2023 ASBC Asian U22 Boxing Championships in Thailand
  - Minimum winners: (Kazakhstan) Sanzhar Tashkenbay (m) / (Uzbekistan) Farzona Fozilova (f)
  - Women's Light Fly winner: (Uzbekistan) Sabina Bobokulova
  - Fly winners: (Philippines) Aaron Jude Bado (m) / (Uzbekistan) Feruza Kazakova (f)
  - Bantam winners: (Kazakhstan) Nursultan Altynbek (m) / (Uzbekistan) Nigina Uktamova (f)
  - Feather winners: (Kazakhstan) Makhmud Sabyrkhan (m) / (Mongolia) Battur Zoljargal (f)
  - Light winners: (Uzbekistan) Dilshod Abdumurodov (m) / (Thailand) Porntip Buapa (f)
  - Light Welter winners: (Uzbekistan) Shakhboz Yunusaliev (m) / (Thailand) Thananya Somnuek (f)
  - Welter winners: (Uzbekistan) Bekhzod Khamidov (m) / (Uzbekistan) Navbakhor Khamidova (f)
  - Light Middle winners: (Uzbekistan) Nurislom Ismoilov (m) / (Kazakhstan) Zhasmin Kizatova (f)
  - Middle winners: (Uzbekistan) Alokhon Abdullaev (m) / (Thailand) Baison Manikon (f)
  - Light Heavy winners: (Uzbekistan) Jasurbek Yuldoshev (m) / (Kazakhstan) Gulsaya Yerzhan (f)
  - Men's Cruiser winner: (Uzbekistan) Shokhjakhon Abdullaev
  - Men's Heavy winner: (Uzbekistan) Nusratbek Tokhirov
  - Men's Super Heavy winner: (Uzbekistan) Jakhongir Zokirov
- February 20–26: 2023 Oceania Youth Boxing Championships in (Samoa) Apia
- May 22–29: 2023 Oceania Boxing Championships in (New Zealand) Wellington

=== World Boxing Tour ===
Golden Belt

- January 31 – February 12: IBA Golden Belt #1 in (Morocco) Marrakesh
- TBA: IBA Golden Belt #2 in (Slovenia) Maribor

== Breaking ==
=== Major events ===
- May 12–13: 2023 WDSF African Championships in (Morocco) Rabat
  - Winners: (Morocco) Bilal Mallakh (b-boys) / (Morocco) Fatima El-Mamouny (b-girls)
- June 26–27: 2023 European Games in (Poland) Nowy Sącz
  - Winners: (France) Dany Dann (b-boys) / (Netherlands) India Sardjoe (b-girls)
- September 22–24: 2023 WDSF World Breaking Championship in (Belgium) Leuven
  - Winners: (United States) Victor Montalvo (b-boys) / (Lithuania) Dominika Banevič (b-girls)
- October 6–7: 2022 Asian Games in (China) Hangzhou
  - Winners: (Japan) Shigeyuki Nakarai (b-boys) / (China) Liu Qingyi (b-girls)
- October 21: 2023 Red Bull BC One World Final in (France) Paris
  - Winners: (South Korea) Hong 10 (b-boys) / (Japan) Ami (b-girls)
- October 27–28: 2023 WDSF Oceania Championship in (Australia) Sydney
  - Winners: (Australia) Jeffrey Dan Arpie (b-boys) / (Australia) Rachael Gunn (b-girls)
- November 3–4: 2023 Pan American Games in (Chile) Santiago
  - Winners: (Canada) Philip Kim (b-boys) / (United States) Sunny Choi (b-girls)

== See also ==
- 2023 in sports
  - 2023 in sports (A)
  - 2023 in sports (C–J)
  - 2023 in sports (K–S)
  - 2023 in sports (T–Z)
