= 2018 African Championships in Athletics – Men's shot put =

The men's shot put event at the 2018 African Championships in Athletics was held on 2 August in Asaba, Nigeria.

== Results ==
Rank	Athlete	Nationality	#1	#2	#3	#4	#5	#6	Result	Notes
1st place, gold medalist(s)	Chukwuebuka Enekwechi	Nigeria	19.49	19.27	19.06	19.06	21.08	20.38	21.08	CR
2nd place, silver medalist(s)	Mohamed Magdi Hamza Khalif	Egypt	18.46	19.23	19.23	x	19.33	x	19.33	
3rd place, bronze medalist(s)	Kyle Blignaut	South Africa	18.04	18.19	18.19	19.05	17.75	18.07	19.05	
4	Kalu Eke	Nigeria	17.60	18.14	18.79	x	17.93	18.42	18.79	
5	Jason van Rooyen	South Africa	17.58	18.07	17.98	x	18.27	x	18.27	
6	Henry-Bernard Baptiste	Mauritius	17.99	17.37	17.89	x	x	17.86	17.99	
7	Adantor Yao	Togo	16.25	17.32	x	17.33	17.18	x	17.33	
8	Zegeye Moga	Ethiopia	x	x	15.18	x	14.90	x	15.18	
	Kuiche Takougoun	Cameroon	x	x	x				NM	
	Essohounamondom Tchalim	Togo							DNS	
	Mostafa Amr Hassan	Egypt							DNS	
	Orazio Cremona	South Africa							DNS	
