= Athletics at the 2019 African Games – Men's shot put =

The men's shot put event at the 2019 African Games was held on 27 August in Rabat.

== Results ==
Rank	Name	Nationality	#1	#2	#3	#4	#5	#6	Result	Notes
1st place, gold medalist(s)	Chukwuebuka Enekwechi	Nigeria	20.09	20.91	20.97	21.07	21.44	21.48	21.48	GR
2nd place, silver medalist(s)	Mohamed Ibrahim Khalifa	Egypt	x	18.66	19.20	19.60	20.20	20.85	20.85	
3rd place, bronze medalist(s)	Mostafa Amr Hassan	Egypt	19.81	19.70	x	19.29	20.74	x	20.74	
4	Dotun Ogundeji	Nigeria	18.72	x	19.68	19.92	x	20.06	20.06	
5	Orazio Cremona	South Africa	19.51	19.30	20.06	19.56	19.79	x	20.06	
6	Franck Elemba	Republic of the Congo	18.70	19.17	19.00	19.13	x	19.10	19.17	
7	Kyle Blignaut	South Africa	17.98	17.80	x	17.63	17.65	17.81	17.98	
8	Henry-Bernard Baptiste	Mauritius	16.44	17.88	17.73	17.65	x	16.77	17.88	
9	Amine Moukhles	Morocco	16.12	16.07	x				16.12	
10	Billy Jospen Takougoum Kuitch	Cameroon	x	14.49	16.06				16.06	
11	Mohammed Chachi	Morocco	15.09	14.82	x				15.09	
12	Zegeye Moga	Ethiopia	14.16	13.87	x				14.16	
	Dominic Ondigi Abunda	Kenya							DNS	
