= 2026 African Championships in Athletics – Men's shot put =

Men's shot put at the 2026 African Championships in Athletics
- Venue: Legon Sports Stadium
- Location: Accra, Ghana
- Dates: 12 May
- Competitors: 6 from 6 nations
- Winning time: 20.01

Medalists
gold medal	Aiden Smith	South Africa
silver medal	Mostafa Amr Hassan	Egypt
bronze medal	Billy Takougoum Kuitche	Cameroon

The men's shot put event at the 2026 African Championships in Athletics was held on 12 May in Accra, Ghana.

== Results ==
Rank	Athlete	Nationality	#1	#2	#3	#4	#5	#6	Result	Notes
1st place, gold medalist(s)	Aiden Smith	South Africa							20.01	
2nd place, silver medalist(s)	Mostafa Amr Hassan	Egypt							18.89	
3rd place, bronze medalist(s)	Billy Takougoum Kuitche	Cameroon							17.01	
4	Henry Bernard Baptiste	Mauritius							16.99	
5	Emmanuel Audu	Nigeria							15.95	
6	Nanawe Gindaba	Ethiopia							15.29	
