= 2022 African Championships in Athletics – Men's shot put =

The men's shot put event at the 2022 African Championships in Athletics was held on 12 June in Port Louis, Mauritius.

== Results ==
Rank	Athlete	Nationality	#1	#2	#3	#4	#5	#6	Result	Notes
1st place, gold medalist(s)	Chukwuebuka Enekwechi	Nigeria	20.21	20.11	20.29	20.46	21.20	20.09	21.20	CR
2nd place, silver medalist(s)	Kyle Blignaut	South Africa	20.32	20.60	20.16	19.67	x	x	20.60	
3rd place, bronze medalist(s)	Mohamed Magdi Hamza	Egypt	19.95	20.33	x	19.63	19.96	20.10	20.33	
4	Dotun Ogundeji	Nigeria	18.45	18.13	18.49	x	19.11	x	19.11	
5	Bernard Baptiste	Mauritius	16.79	16.38	17.66	17.06	17.47	17.27	17.66	
6	Cian de Villiers	South Africa	16.66	16.94	x	17.20	x	x	17.20	
7	Sié Fahige Kambou	Burkina Faso	14.41	13.27	x	14.24	14.24	x	14.41	
	Aboubakar Sidick Tetndap Nsangou	Cameroon							DNS	
	Isaac Odugbesan	Nigeria							DNS	
