= 2018 IAAF World U20 Championships – Men's shot put =

Men's shot put at the 2018 World U20 Championships
- Venue: Ratina Stadium
- Dates: 10 July
- Competitors: 26 from 20 nations
- Winning distance: 22.07 m

Medalists
gold medal	Kyle Blignaut	South Africa
silver medal	Adrian Piperi	United States
bronze medal	Odysseas Mouzenidis	Greece

The men's shot put at the 2018 IAAF World U20 Championships was held at Ratina Stadium on 10 July.

== Records ==
Standing records prior to the 2018 IAAF World U20 Championships in Athletics
World U20 Record	Jacko Gill (NZL)	23.00	Auckland, New Zealand	18 August 2013
Championship Record	Andrei Toader (ROU)	22.30	Bydgoszcz, Poland	19 July 2016
World U20 Leading	Kyle Blignaut (RSA)	21.65	Boksburg, South Africa	28 April 2018

== Results ==
=== Qualification ===
The qualification round took place in two groups, with Group A starting at 09:10 and Group B starting at 10:24. Athletes attaining a mark of at least 19.60 metres( Q ) or at least the 12 best performers ( q ) qualified for the final.

Rank	Group	Name	Nationality	Round			Mark	Notes
Rank	Group	Name	Nationality	1	2	3	Mark	Notes
1	A	Adrian Piperi	United States	21.42			21.42	Q
2	A	Odysseas Mouzenidis	Greece	20.36			20.36	Q
3	B	Aleh Tamashevich	Belarus	20.16			20.16	Q, PB
4	A	Dzmitry Karpuk	Belarus	19.66			19.66	Q
5	B	Kyle Blignaut	South Africa	19.60			19.60	Q
6	A	Triston Gibbons	Barbados	18.34	19.44	x	19.44	q
7	B	Aiden Harvey	Australia	18.34	19.39	19.22	19.39	q
8	B	Jordan West	United States	18.75	19.19	19.20	19.20	q
9	A	Ryan Ballantyne	New Zealand	18.62	18.61	19.03	19.03	q
10	B	Eero Ahola	Finland	18.93	18.71	19.02	19.02	q
11	A	Alexander Kolesnikoff	Australia	18.89	18.93	x	18.93	q
12	A	Artem Levchenko	Ukraine	18.54	18.91	18.48	18.91	q, PB
13	B	Valentin Moll	Germany	x	18.89	18.45	18.89	
14	A	Ashish Bholothia	India	16.94	x	18.62	18.62	PB
15	A	Alperen Karahan	Turkey	18.51	18.48	x	18.51	
16	B	Iason Machairas	Greece	18.27	x	x	18.27	
17	A	Tadeáš Procházka	Czech Republic	18.17	18.10	17.24	18.17	
18	B	Bogdan Zdravković	Serbia	17.98	17.05	x	17.98	
19	A	Timo Northoff	Germany	x	17.07	17.84	17.84	
20	A	Adrián Baran	Slovakia	17.73	17.41	17.81	17.81	
21	B	Nermin Štitkovac	Bosnia and Herzegovina	17.17	17.36	17.62	17.62	
22	B	Fred Moudani-Likibi	France	17.23	17.21	16.98	17.23	
23	B	Yeo Jin-seong	South Korea	x	x	17.05	17.05	
24	A	Alessandro Pace	Italy	16.72	16.70	16.95	16.95	
25	B	Motaz El Gohary	Egypt	16.62	16.83	16.57	16.83	
26	B	Nick Palmer	New Zealand	x	x	16.82	16.82	

=== Final ===
The final took place at 18:10.

Rank	Name	Nationality	Round						Mark	Notes
Rank	Name	Nationality	1	2	3	4	5	6	Mark	Notes
1st place, gold medalist(s)	Kyle Blignaut	South Africa	20.89	21.12	20.87	20.61	22.07	21.18	22.07	WU20L, AFU20R
2nd place, silver medalist(s)	Adrian Piperi	United States	20.73	20.83	21.01	20.89	22.06	21.58	22.06	AMU20R
3rd place, bronze medalist(s)	Odysseas Mouzenidis	Greece	x	20.59	21.07	20.84	x	x	21.07	NU20R
4	Dzmitry Karpuk	Belarus	19.01	20.84	20.20	x	x	x	20.84	
5	Aleh Tamashevich	Belarus	20.37	x	x	19.09	19.93	x	20.37	PB
6	Jordan West	United States	19.86	19.69	x	x	x	x	19.86	
7	Aiden Harvey	Australia	18.17	19.48	19.08	19.17	19.13	19.85	19.85	PB
8	Ryan Ballantyne	New Zealand	18.89	19.39	x	19.25	x	x	19.39	
9	Artem Levchenko	Ukraine	19.24	x	18.97				19.24	PB
10	Eero Ahola	Finland	19.23	18.85	18.85				19.23	
11	Alexander Kolesnikoff	Australia	18.17	18.28	x				18.28	
12	Triston Gibbons	Barbados	x	17.71	18.02				18.02	
