= Mostafa Amr Hassan =

Egyptian shot putter (born 1995)

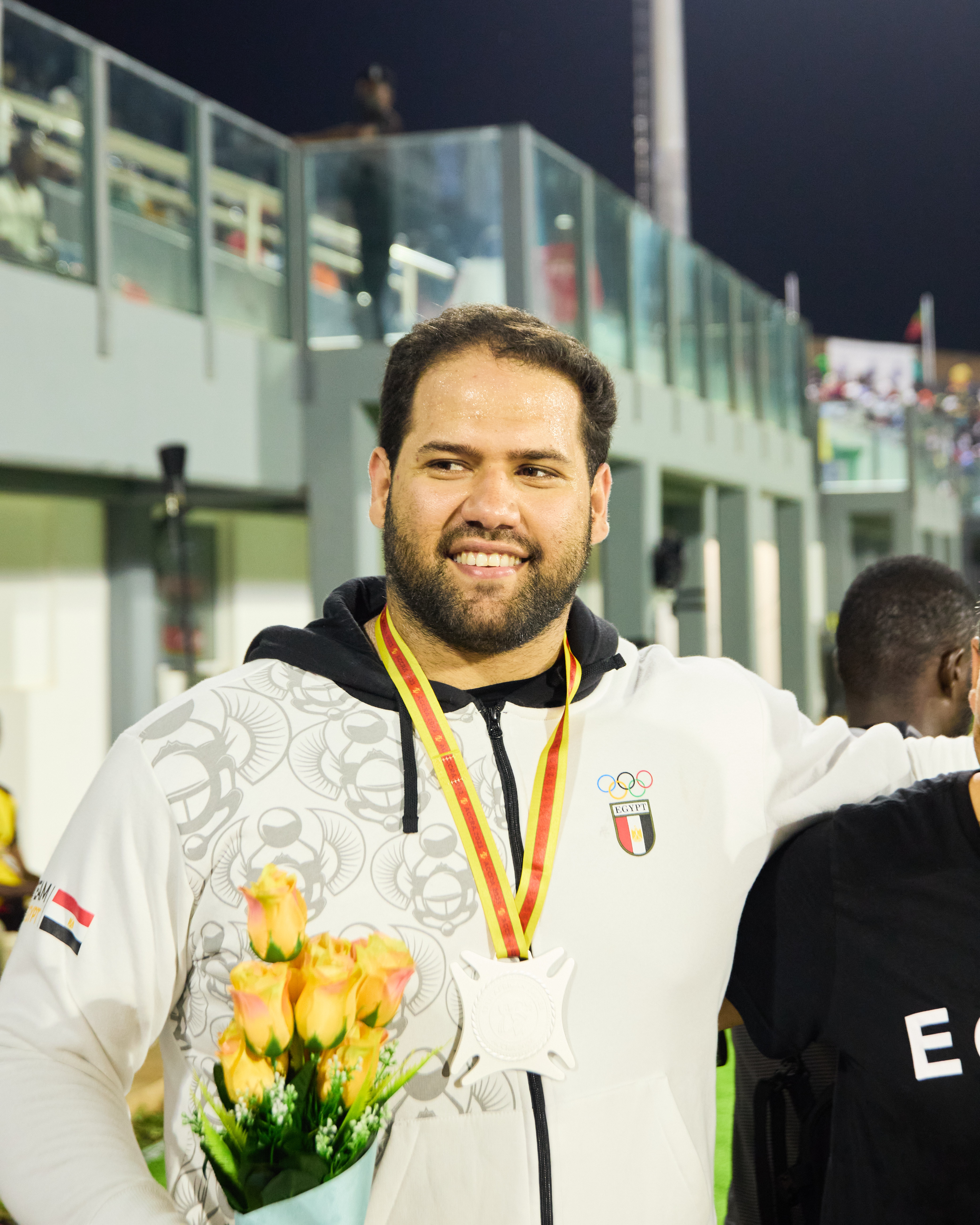
- 2023 African Games

Personal information
- Full name: Mostafa Amr Ahmed Ahmed Hassan
- Nickname: Moose
- Born: 16 December 1995 (age 30) Cairo, Egypt
- Height: 1.90 m (6 ft 3 in)
- Weight: 305 lb (138 kg)

Sport
- Country: Egypt
- Sport: Track and field
- Event: Shot put
Medal record
Men's athletics
Representing Egypt
African Games
| Silver medal – second place | 2023 Accra | Shot put |
| Bronze medal – third place | 2019 Rabat | Shot put |
African Championships
| Silver medal – second place | 2024 Douala | Shot put |
| Silver medal – second place | 2026 Accra | Shot put |

Mostafa Amr Ahmed Ahmed Hassan (born 16 December 1995) is an Egyptian athlete specialising in the shot put. He finished in the top 8 at the 2020 Olympic games in Tokyo, Japan. He competed at the 2015, 2017, and 2019 World Championships. He is the 2017 NCAA D1 indoor shot put champion, and the Egyptian record holder both indoor and outdoor.

Hassan competed for the Colorado State Rams track and field team, where he won two national titles in the shot put at the NCAA Division I Indoor Track and Field Championships.

On 16 March 2023 he achieved an Egyptian record with a mark of 21.65m.

== Competition record ==
| Year | Competition | Venue | Position | Event | Notes |
Representing Egypt
| 2014 | World Junior Championships | Eugene, United States | 8th | Shot put (6 kg) | 19.20 m |
| 2015 | Arab Championships | Isa Town, Bahrain | 1st | Shot put | 19.22 m |
| 2015 | World Championships | Beijing, China | 18th (q) | Shot put | 19.65 m |
| 2016 | World Indoor Championships | Portland, United States | 13th | Shot put | 19.81 m |
| 2017 | NCAA Championships | Texas, United States | 1st | Shot put | 21.27 m |
| 2017 | World Championships | London, United Kingdom | 30th (q) | Shot put | 19.23 m |
| 2018 | NCAA Championships | Texas, United States | 1st | Shot put | 20.86 m |
| 2018 | Mediterranean Games | Tarragona, Spain | 11th | Shot put | 18.35 m |
| 2019 | Arab Championships | Cairo, Egypt | 1st | Shot put | 20.60 m |
| 2019 | African Games | Rabat, Morocco | 3rd | Shot put | 20.74 m |
| 2019 | World Championships | Doha, Qatar | 14th (q) | Shot put | 20.55 m |
| 2021 | Olympic Games | Tokyo, Japan | 8th | Shot put | 20.73 m |
| 2023 | Arab Championships | Marrakesh, Morocco | 1st | Shot put | 20.63 m |
| 2023 | Arab Games | Oran, Algeria | 1st | Shot put | 20.52 m |
| 2023 | World Championships | Budapest, Hungary | 10th | Shot put | 20.17 m |
| 2024 | World Indoor Championships | Glasgow, United Kingdom | 14th | Shot put | 19.88 m |
| 2024 | African Games | Accra, Ghana | 2nd | Shot put | 20.70 m |
| 2024 | African Championships | Douala, Cameroon | 2nd | Shot put | 20.25 m |
| 2024 | Olympic Games | Paris, France | 20th (q) | Shot put | 19.70 m |
| 2026 | African Championships | Accra, Ghana | 2nd | Shot put | 18.89 m |
| 2026 | Mediterranean Games | Taranto, Italy | 4th | Shot put | 19.85 m |

== See also ==
- Egypt at the 2015 World Championships in Athletics
- List of Egyptian records in athletics
