= Mohamed Magdi Hamza =

Egyptian olympic athlete

Mohamed Magdi Hamza Khalif
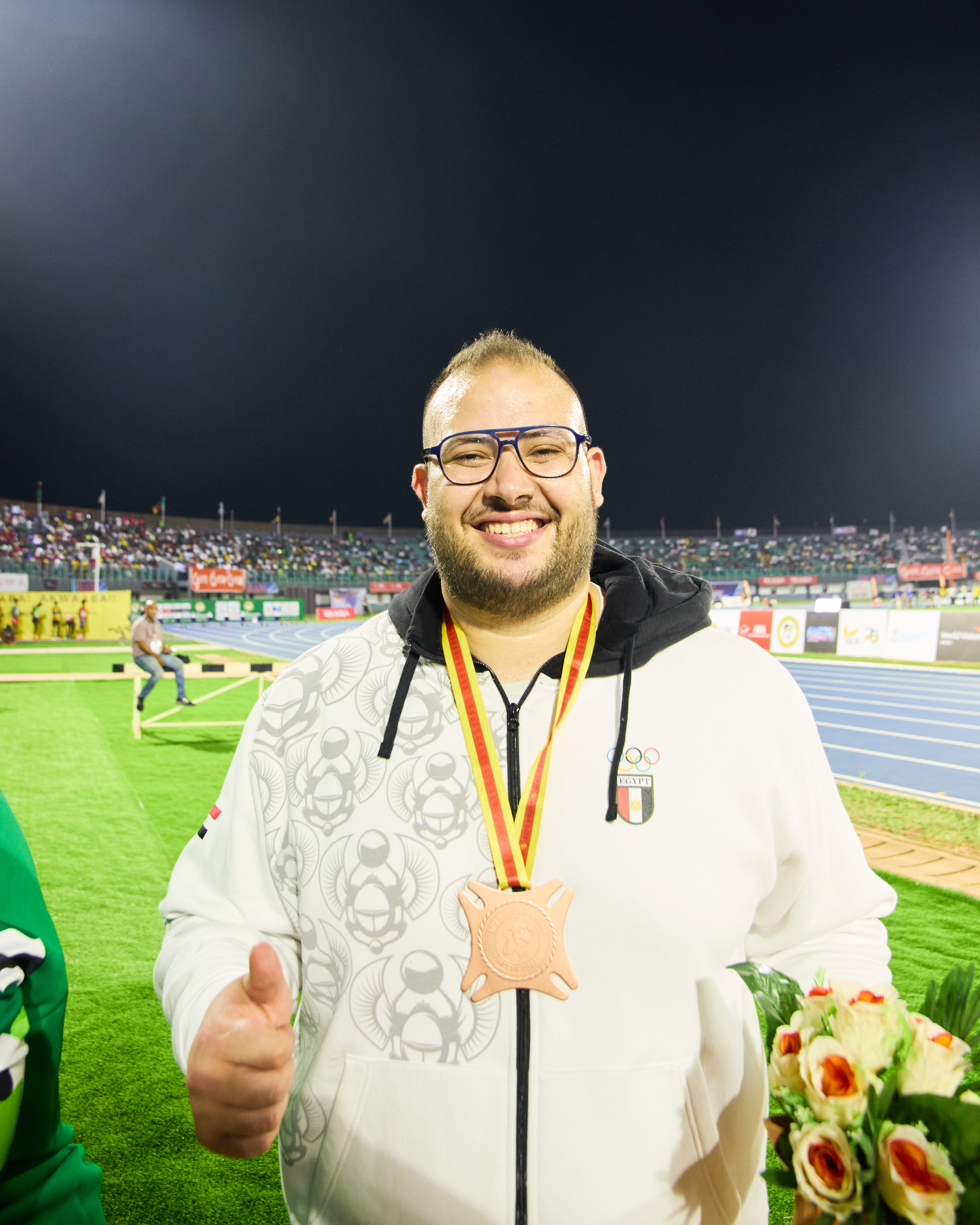
- 2023 African Games

Personal information
- Born: 30 August 1996 (age 30)
- Education: business information system
- Height: 199 cm (6 ft 6 in)
- Weight: 160 kg (353 lb)

Sport
- Sport: Athletics
- Event: Shot put
- Coached by: yasser fathy
Medal record
Men's athletics
Representing Egypt
African Games
| Silver medal – second place | 2015 Brazzaville | Shot put |
| Silver medal – second place | 2019 Rabat | Shot put |
| Bronze medal – third place | 2023 Accra | Shot put |
African Championships
| Silver medal – second place | 2018 Asaba | Shot put |
| Bronze medal – third place | 2022 Saint Pierre | Shot put |
Islamic Solidarity Games
| Gold medal – first place | 2025 Riyadh | Shot put |
Mediterranean Games
| Bronze medal – third place | 2022 Oran | Shot put |
| Bronze medal – third place | 2026 Taranto | Shot put |

Mohamed Magdi Hamza Khalif (born 30 August 1996), also known as Mohamed Khalifa, is an Egyptian olympic athlete specialising in the shot put. He won silver medals at the 2018 African Championships and 2015 African Games.

His personal bests are 21.39 metres (Egyptian record) outdoors (Cairo 2016) and 19.35 metres indoors (Jablonec nad Nisou 2017).

== International competitions ==
| Year | Competition | Venue | Position | Event | Notes |
Representing Egypt
| 2013 | African Youth Championships | Warri, Nigeria | 1st | Shot put (5 kg) | 21.22 m |
| 2013 | African Youth Championships | Warri, Nigeria | 1st | Discus throw (1.5 kg) | 58.62 m |
| 2013 | Arab Youth Championships | Cairo, Egypt | 1st | Shot put (5 kg) | 20.17 m |
| 2013 | Arab Youth Championships | Cairo, Egypt | 2nd | Discus throw (1.5 kg) | 56.96 m |
| 2013 | World Youth Championships | Donetsk, Ukraine | 3rd | Shot put (5 kg) | 20.58 m |
| 2013 | World Youth Championships | Donetsk, Ukraine | 24th (q) | Discus throw (1.5 kg) | 52.56 m |
| 2014 | World Junior Championships | Eugene, United States | 4th | Shot put (6 kg) | 19.85 m |
| 2014 | African Championships | Marrakesh, Morocco | 5th | Shot put | 17.64 m |
| 2015 | African Junior Championships | Addis Ababa, Ethiopia | 1st | Shot put (6 kg) | 20.66 m |
| 2015 | African Junior Championships | Addis Ababa, Ethiopia | 4th | Discus throw (1.75 kg) | 52.04 m |
| 2015 | Arab Championships | Isa Town, Bahrain | 2nd | Shot put | 18.38 m |
| 2015 | African Games | Brazzaville, Republic of the Congo | 2nd | Shot put | 19.78 m |
| 2016 | Mediterranean U23 Championships | Tunis, Tunisia | 1st | Shot put | 19.42 m |
| 2016 | African Championships | Durban, South Africa | 6th | Shot put | 19.00 m |
| 2018 | Mediterranean Games | Tarragona, Spain | 10th (q) | Shot put | 18.58 m |
| 2018 | African Championships | Asaba, Nigeria | 2nd | Shot put | 19.33 m |
| 2019 | Arab Championships | Cairo, Egypt | 2nd | Shot put | 20.39 m |
| 2019 | Universiade | Naples, Italy | 8th | Shot put | 19.26 m |
| 2019 | World Championships | Doha, Qatar | 25th (q) | Shot put | 19.91 m |
| 2021 | Arab Championships | Radès, Tunisia | 2nd | Shot put | 20.30 m |
| 2021 | Olympic Games | Tokyo, Japan | 25th (q) | Shot put | 19.82 m |
| 2022 | African Championships | Port Louis, Mauritius | 3rd | Shot put | 20.33 m |
| 2022 | Mediterranean Games | Oran, Algeria | 3rd | Shot put | 20.35 m |
| 2023 | Arab Championships | Marrakesh, Morocco | 2nd | Shot put | 20.33 m |
| 2023 | World Championships | Budapest, Hungary | 14th (q) | Shot put | 20.68 m |
| 2024 | African Games | Accra, Ghana | 3rd | Shot put | 20.29 m |
| 2025 | World Championships | Tokyo, Japan | 24th (q) | Shot put | 19.49 m |
| 2025 | Islamic Solidarity Games | Riyadh, Saudi Arabia | 1st | Shot put | 19.39 m |
| 2026 | Mediterranean Games | Taranto, Italy | 3rd | Shot put | 20.21 m |
