= Chukwuebuka Enekwechi =

Nigerian-American athlete (born 1993)

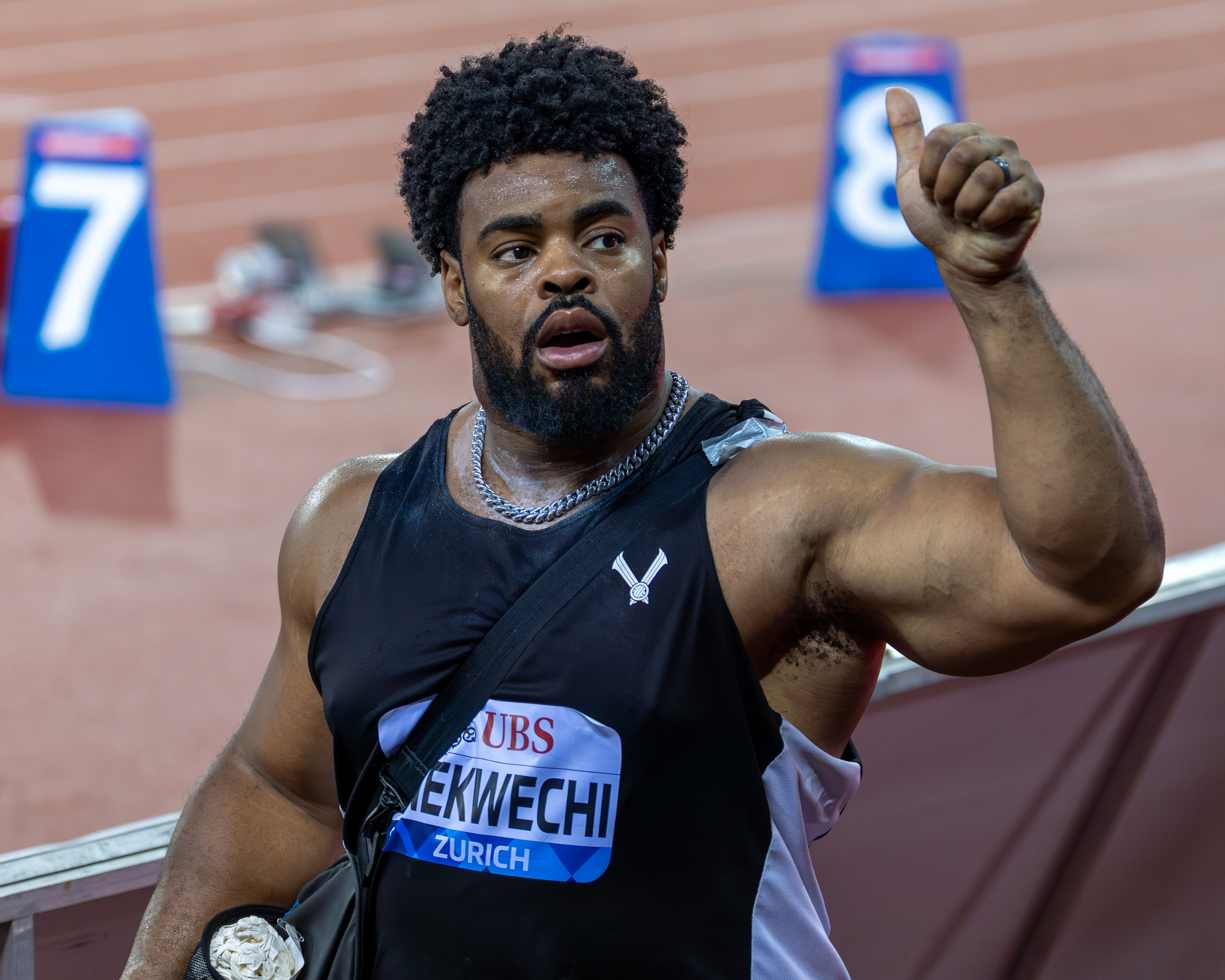
- Chukwuebuka Enekwechi at the 2026 Wanda Diamond League’s Weltklasse Zürich athletics competition.

Personal information
- Full name: Chukwuebuka Cornnell Enekwechi
- Nationality: American, Nigerian
- Born: 28 January 1993 (age 33) Queens, New York, U.S.
- Education: Purdue University
- Height: 1.80 m (5 ft 11 in)

Sport
- Country: Nigeria
- Sport: Athletics
- Sprint: Shot Put
- College team: Purdue Boilermakers

Achievements and titles
- Highest world ranking: 8
- Personal bests: Outdoor Shot Put 22.10 (Eugene 2025); Indoor Shot Put 21.20 (Iowa City 2023); Hammer Throw 72.77 (East Lansing 2015)
Medal record
Men's Athletics
Representing Nigeria
Commonwealth Games
Gold medal – first place	2026 Glasgow	Shot put
Silver medal – second place	2018 Gold Coast	Shot put
African Games
Gold medal – first place	2019 Rabat	Shot put
Gold medal – first place	2023 Accra	Shot put
African Championships
Gold medal – first place	2018 Asaba	Shot put
Gold medal – first place	2022 Saint Pierre	Shot put
Gold medal – first place	2024 Douala	Shot put
- Updated on 21 Sept 2019

Chukwuebuka Cornnell Enekwechi (born 28 January 1993) is a track and field athlete, specializing in throwing events. Born in the United States, he competes internationally for Nigeria. He is the 2018 Commonwealth Games Silver medalist and reigning African Champion in the shot put. He is also the 2019 African Games Champion and the reigning Nigerian National Sports Festival Champion.

== Personal ==
His parents, Christian and Christiana Enekwechi, are Nigerians from Anambra and Imo State, respectively. He has three siblings. His brother, Chukwusom is a professional wrestler, currently signed to the WWE performing on the NXT brand with the ring name Tyriek Igwe. Enekwechi also works as a throws coach for West Lafayette High School.

== Career ==
While competing for Purdue University, he threw the shot put, discus, hammer and weight. He was runner-up at the 2016 NCAA Championships in the shot put and sixth in the hammer that same day. He was the 2014 and 2015 Big Ten Champion in the Hammer Throw and also the Field athlete of the year in 2015.

While at Francis Lewis High School, he won two city championships, and was the 2012 USA Track & Field Youth Champion in the shot put.

=== Post Collegiate ===
Enekwechi threw over twenty metres in the shot put for the first time in 2016. He won his first national title at the 2016 Nigerian Championships in Sapele with a distance of 19.60 m. He chased after the Olympic qualification shot put mark of 20.50 m but only managed a best of 20.45 that year. It was in 2017 that he first represented Nigeria internationally. At the London World Championships, he did not make it out of the qualifying round. He also represented Nigeria at the 2018 World Indoor Championships.

2018 was a breakthrough year for Enekwechi. At the Gold Coast Commonwealth Games, he won a silver medal behind Tom Walsh with a throw of 21.14 m. At the time, this was a personal best for him. Enekwechi then went on to win the shot put title at the African championships in Asaba later in the year. His winning mark of 21.08 m is the African championships record. As the African champion, he was selected to represent Africa at the Ostrava Continental Cup. In December 2018, he won both the shot put and hammer throw at the 19th National Sports Festival in Abuja. He set a national sports festival record of 20.36 to win the shot put.

He began his 2019 outdoor season with a shot put personal best of 21.28 m at the Taylor George Glass Invitational. This mark remained one of the top ten throws in the world until he bettered it at the Grande Premio Brasil Caixa de Atletismo World Challenge meet. He set a new Nigerian National record of 21.77 m to win the event. This record bettered the previous record held by Stephen Mozia which was 21.76 m. Enekwechi represented Nigeria at the 2019 All Africa Games. Going into the competition, he had bettered his national record with a throw of 21.80 m a little over a week before the games. Showing impressive consistency, he won the event with a 21.48 m throw, which is also an African Games record. This made him the third Nigerian man to win the event at the African Games. He represented Nigeria at the 2019 World Championships in Doha. Going into the championships, he was still ranked within the top ten in the world.

Competing at the 2026 Commonwealth Games in Glasgow, Enekwechi won the gold medal, becoming the first Nigerian man to win the shot put title at the Games.

== National Titles ==
- Shot put: 2016

== Personal bests ==
Outdoor

- Shot put – 22.10 (Eugene 2025)

Indoor

- Shot put – 21.20 (Iowa City 2023)
