= 2023 FIBA Intercontinental Cup =

2023 FIBA Intercontinental Cup may refer to:

- 2023 FIBA Intercontinental Cup (February), tournament held in Tenerife, Spain
- 2023 FIBA Intercontinental Cup (September), tournament held in Singapore
