= Calzadilla =

Coordinates: 40°04′N 6°32′W

Calzadilla, Spain
- municipality
- Flag Coat of arms
- Interactive map of Calzadilla, Spain
- Country: Spain
- Autonomous community: Extremadura
- Province: Cáceres
- Municipality: Calzadilla

Area
  - Total: 76 km^{2} (29 sq mi)

Population (2025-01-01)
  - Total: 450
  - Density: 5.9/km^{2} (15/sq mi)
- Time zone: UTC+1 (CET)
  - Summer (DST): UTC+2 (CEST)

Calzadilla (Spanish pronunciation: [kalθaˈðiʎa]) is a municipality located in the province of Cáceres, Extremadura, Spain. According to the 2006 census (INE), the municipality has a population of 491 inhabitants.

== See also ==
- List of municipalities in Cáceres
