= Athletics at the 2023 African Games – Men's shot put =

Men's shot put at the 2023 African Games
- Venue: Legon Sports Stadium
- Location: Accra, Ghana
- Dates: 19 March
- Competitors: 9 from 6 nations
- Winning distance: 21.06 m

Medalists
gold medal	Chukwuebuka Enekwechi	Nigeria
silver medal	Mostafa Amr Hassan	Egypt
bronze medal	Mohamed Magdi Hamza	Egypt

The men's shot put event at the 2023 African Games was held on 19 March 2024 in Accra, Ghana.

== Results ==
Held on 19 March

Rank	Name	Nationality	#1	#2	#3	#4	#5	#6	Result	Notes
1st place, gold medalist(s)	Chukwuebuka Enekwechi	Nigeria	20.54	19.56	21.06	x	x	x	21.06	
2nd place, silver medalist(s)	Mostafa Amr Hassan	Egypt	19.28	19.78	20.63	x	20.21	20.70	20.70	
3rd place, bronze medalist(s)	Mohamed Magdi Hamza	Egypt	18.43	19.51	19.50	20.29	x	19.96	20.29	
4	Henry-Bernard Baptiste	Mauritius	17.85	16.56	16.99	17.42	x	16.76	17.85	
5	Emeka Ugwu	Nigeria	15.54	16.43	15.04	16.06	15.33	15.48	16.43	
6	Cornelius Kuhn	Namibia	15.60	15.08	15.01	15.43	15.90	15.84	15.90	
7	Essohounamondom Tchalim	Togo	15.58	x	x	14.20	x	x	15.58	
8	Nanawe Gindaba	Ethiopia	14.06	14.66	13.74	14.75	14.47	14.01	14.75	
9	Zegeye Moga	Ethiopia	14.12	13.83	14.04				14.04	
