= Kyle Blignaut =

South African shot putter (born 1999)

Personal information
- Born: 9 November 1999 (age 26)
- Height: 195 cm (6 ft 5 in)
- Weight: 150 kg (331 lb)

Sport
- Country: South Africa
- Sport: Athletics
- Event: Shot put

Achievements and titles
- Personal best: 21.26 m (69 ft 9 in) (2024)
Medal record
Men's athletics
Representing South Africa
African Championships
Silver medal – second place	2022 Saint Pierre	Shot put
Bronze medal – third place	2018 Asaba	Shot put
World U20 Championships
Gold medal – first place	2018 Tampere	Shot put
African U20 Championships
Gold medal – first place	2017 Tlemcen	Shot put

Kayle "Kyle" Blignaut (born 9 November 1999) is a South African athlete who specialises in the shot put.

Blignaut won the gold medal at the 2018 IAAF World U20 Championships in Tampere. In May 2021 he threw a 21.21m personal best to meet the qualifying standard for the delayed 2020 Tokyo Olympics during the USSA (South African Universities) Championships in Johannesburg. The throw put him fourth on the South Africa all-time list.

He was selected for the shot put competition at the 2023 World Athletics Championships in Budapest, but he did not qualify for the final.

He competed in the shot put at the 2024 Summer Olympics in Paris in August 2024.
