= Guinea-Bissau at the 2019 African Games =

- Flag of Guinea-Bissau
- IOC code: GBS
- NOC: Guinea-Bissau Olympic Committee
- Website: cogb.gw

in Rabat, Morocco 19 August 2019 – 31 August 2019
- Competitors: 5 (4 men and 1 woman) in 3 sports and 6 events
- Medals Ranked 34th: Gold 0 Silver 1 Bronze 0 Total 1

African Games appearances
- 1999; 2003; 2007; 2011; 2015; 2019; 2023

Guinea-Bissau competed at the 2019 African Games held from 19 to 31 August 2019 in Rabat, Morocco. In total, five athletes represented the country in three sports and they won one silver medal. The country finished 34th in the medal table.

== Medal summary ==
=== Medal table ===
Medal	Name	Sport	Event	Date
Silver	Mbunde Cumba	Wrestling	Men's freestyle +65 kg	30 August

Medals by sport
Sport	1st place, gold medalist(s)	2nd place, silver medalist(s)	3rd place, bronze medalist(s)	Total
Wrestling	0	1	0	1
Total	0	1	0	1

== Athletics ==
Jessica Inchude was scheduled to compete in athletics in the women's shot put and women's discus throw events but she did not compete in either event.

== Taekwondo ==
One athlete competed in Taekwondo.

Athlete	Event	Round of 32	Round of 16	Quarterfinals	Semifinals	Final	
Athlete	Event	Opposition Result	Opposition Result	Opposition Result	Opposition Result	Opposition Result	Rank
António Na Binhom	Men's –74 kg	Kolade (NGR); L 4–39	did not advance				

== Wrestling ==
Three athletes represented Guinea-Bissau in wrestling.

Mbunde Cumba won the silver medal in the Men's freestyle -65 kg event. The country finished in 9th place in the wrestling medal table.

Key:

- VT – Victory by fall.
- PP – Decision by points – the loser with technical points.
- PO – Decision by points – the loser without technical points.
- ST – Great superiority – the loser without technical points and a margin of victory of at least 8 (Greco-Roman) or 10 (freestyle) points.
- SP – Technical superiority – the loser with technical points and a margin of victory of at least 8 (Greco-Roman) or 10 (freestyle) points.

Men's freestyle

Athlete	Event	Qualification	Quarterfinal	Semifinal	Repechage 1	Final / BM	
Athlete	Event	Opposition Result	Opposition Result	Opposition Result	Opposition Result	Opposition Result	Rank
Diamantino Fafé	−57 kg	M I Camara (GUI); W 12–0 ^{VT}	O Faye (SEN); W 11–0 ^{VT}	A Kherbache (ALG); L 0–4 ^{ST}	Bye	G Mohamed (EGY); L 3–3 ^{PP}	5
Mbunde Cumba	−65 kg	C Ndri (CIV); W 10–0 ^{ST}	J Bandou (MRI); W 2–0 ^{VT}	K Ben Telili (TUN); W 14–4 ^{SP}	Bye	A Daniel (NGR); L 1–2 ^{PP}	2nd place, silver medalist(s)
Augusto Midana	−74 kg	I Boukhors (ALG); L 4–4 ^{PP}	did not advance				11
