= 2024 African Championships in Athletics – Women's pole vault =

Women's pole vault at the 2024 African Championships in Athletics
- Venue: Japoma Stadium
- Location: Douala, Cameroon
- Dates: 22 June
- Competitors: 2 from 2 nations
- Winning height: 4.10 m

Medalists
gold medal	Miré Reinstorf	South Africa
silver medal	Dorra Mahfoudhi	Tunisia

The women's pole vault event at the 2024 African Championships in Athletics was held on 22 June in Douala, Cameroon.

== Records ==
Records before the 2024 African Athletics Championships
Record	Athlete (nation)	Height (m)	Location	Date
World record	Yelena Isinbayeva (RUS)	5.06	Zurich, Switzerland	28 August 2009
African record	Elmarie Gerryts (RSA)	4.42	Wesel, Germany	12 June 2000
Championship record	Syrine Balti (TUN)	4.21	Bambous, Mauritius	10 August 2006
World leading	Molly Caudery (GBR)	4.86	Rouen, France	24 February 2024
African leading	Miré Reinstorf (RSA)	4.35	Accra, Ghana	19 March 2024

== Results ==
Rank	Athlete	Nationality	3.40	3.60	3.70	3.80	3.90	4.00	4.10	4.22	Result	Notes
1st place, gold medalist(s)	Miré Reinstorf	South Africa	–	–	xo	o	o	xo	o	xxx	4.10	
2nd place, silver medalist(s)	Dorra Mahfoudhi	Tunisia	o	xxo	–	xo	o	xxx			3.90	

== See also ==
- Athletics at the 2023 African Games – Women's pole vault
