= Athletics at the 2023 African Games – Women's pole vault =

Women's pole vault at the 2023 African Games
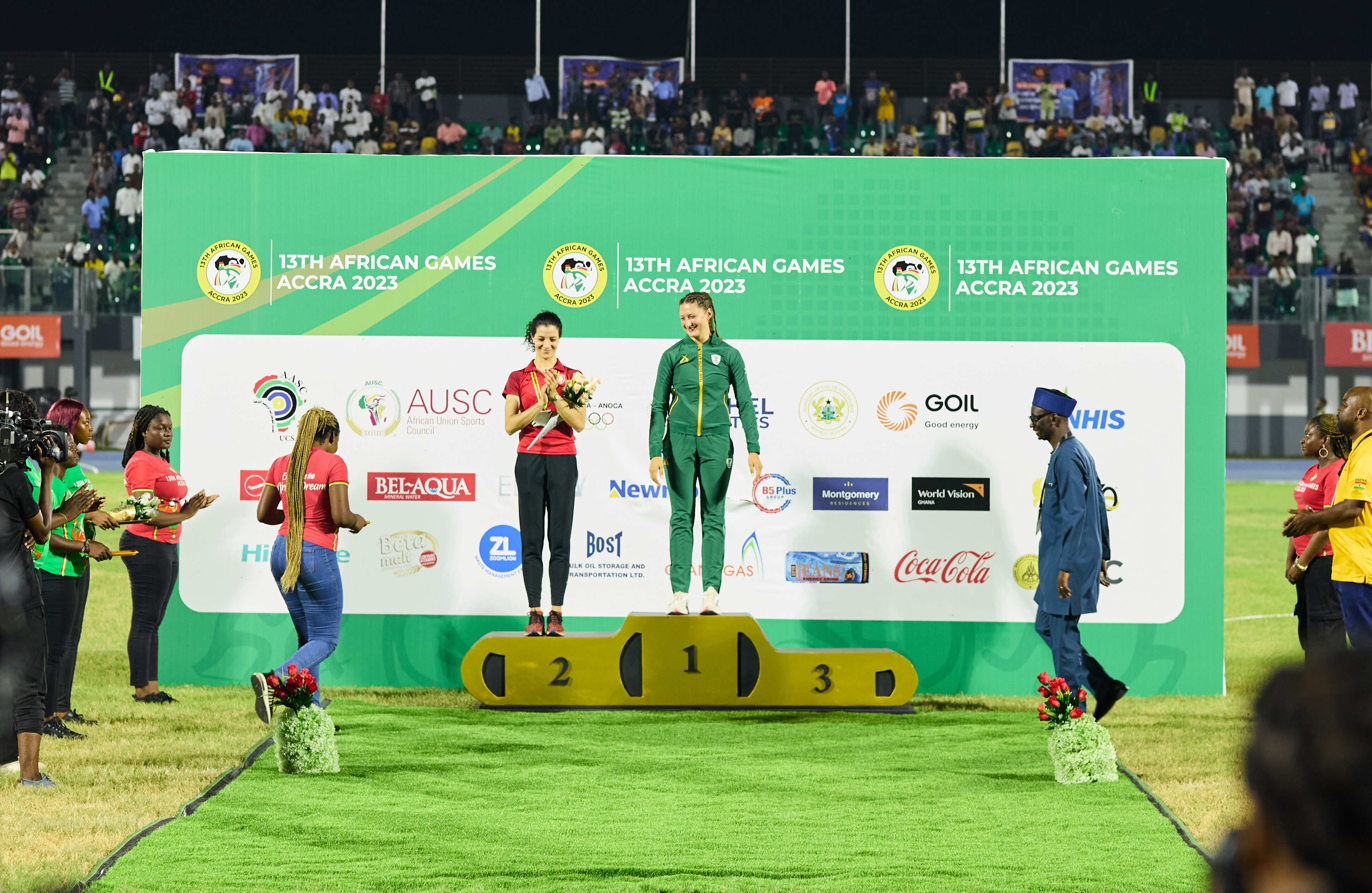
- Miré Reinstorf and Dorra Mahfoudhi on the medal podium following the event
- Venue: University of Ghana Sports Stadium
- Location: Accra, Ghana
- Dates: 19 March
- Competitors: 2 from 2 nations
- Winning height: 4.35 m

Medalists
gold medal	Miré Reinstorf	South Africa
silver medal	Dorra Mahfoudhi	Tunisia

The women's pole vault event at the 2023 African Games in Accra, Ghana, was held on 19 March 2024 at the University of Ghana Sports Stadium.

Miré Reinstorf of South Africa won the event, setting an African Games record with a mark of 4.35 metres. Reinstorf bested Tunisian Dorra Mahfoudhi, the former record holder. Mahfoudhi finished with the silver medal with a mark of 3.70 metres.

== Background ==
Only two competitors competed in the pole vault at the 2019 African Games. South African Miré Reinstorf, making her African Games debut, won the pole vault event at the 2021 World Athletics U20 Championships. Tunisian Dorra Mahfoudhi was a two-time African Games champion coming into the event, having previously won in 2011 and the most recent event in 2019. At the 2019 event, Mahfoudhi set the African Games record with a jump of 4.31 metres.

=== Records ===
The women's pole vault world record of 5.06 metres was set by Yelena Isinbayeva at the Weltklasse Zürich event on 28 August 2009 in Zurich, Switzerland. The African record of 4.42 m was set by Elmarie Gerryts on 12 June 2000 in Wesel, Germany. The Games record was broken in last year's edition of the contest by Mahfoudhi at 4.31 m.

Records before the competition
World record	Yelena Isinbayeva (RUS)	5.06 m	Zurich, Switzerland	28 August 2009
African record	Elmarie Gerryts (RSA)	4.42 m	Wesel, Germany	12 June 2000
African Games record	Dorra Mahfoudhi (TUN)	4.31 m	Rabat, Morocco	27 August 2019

== Results ==
The event was held at 4:40 p.m. GMT on 19 March at the University of Ghana Sports Stadium. Mahfoudi first cleared the mark of 3.50 metres on her first attempt, and cleared 3.70 metres on her second attempt. Reinstorf would clear the 3.80 metre mark on her second attempt. Mahfoudi's day would end at the 3.70 mark, as she failed to clear 3.85 metres, meaning Reinstorf was guaranteed the gold medal.

Reinstorf would go on to clear 4.00 metres on her first attempt at that mark, before equaling her personal record with a jump of 4.15 metres on her second attempt. Reinstorf's run of good form would continue with a jump of 4.25 metres on her third attempt, before breaking Mahfoudi's African Games record with a jump of 4.35 metres on her third attempt. Reinstorf's day would end after failing on 4.45 metres thrice.

Rank	Name	Nationality	3.50	3.70	3.80	3.85	4.00	4.15	4.25	4.35	4.45	Result	Notes
1st place, gold medalist(s)	Miré Reinstorf	South Africa	–	–	xo	–	o	xo	xxo	xxo	xxx	4.35	GR
2nd place, silver medalist(s)	Dorra Mahfoudhi	Tunisia	o	xo	–	xxx						3.70	
