= Nisrine Dinar =

Moroccan pole vaulter

Medal record

Women's athletics

Representing Morocco

Pan Arab Games
Gold medal – first place	2011 Doha	Pole vault
Silver medal – second place	2004 Algiers	Pole vault
Silver medal – second place	2007 Cairo	Pole vault

African Championships
Gold medal – first place	2010 Nairobi	Pole vault
Silver medal – second place	2006 Bambous	Pole vault
Silver medal – second place	2008 Addis Ababa	Pole vault
Silver medal – second place	2014 Marrakesh	Pole vault
Bronze medal – third place	2016 Durban	Pole vault

Nisrine Dinar (born 14 January 1988) is a Moroccan track and field athlete who specialises in the pole vault. Her personal best of 4.05 m (13 ft 3 1/4 in), set in 2006, is the Moroccan national record for the event.

== Career ==
Dinar was the gold medalist at the 2010 African Championships in Athletics. She is a three-time runner-up at that competition. Similarly she was winner at the 2011 Pan Arab Games, having been runner-up in 2004 and 2007, and took two gold and three silver medals at the Arab Athletics Championships. In regional competitions, Dinar has often finished behind Tunisians Syrine Balti and Leila Ben Youssef.

She has represented Africa twice at the IAAF Continental Cup. She competed in pole vaulting from a young age, winning the 2003 African Junior Athletics Championships at age fifteen and the 2004 Arab Youth Athletics Championships at age sixteen. She won the first ever Moroccan national title in women's pole vault in 2003.

== International competitions ==
Year	Competition	Venue	Position	Event	Notes
2003	African Junior Championships	Garoua, Cameroon	1st	Pole vault	3.20 m
2004	African Championships	Brazzaville, Congo	4th	Pole vault	3.50 m
2004	Arab Youth Championships	Rabat, Morocco	1st	Pole vault	3.70 m
2004	Pan Arab Games	Algiers, Algeria	2nd	Pole vault	3.50 m
2005	Mediterranean Games	Almería, Spain	8th	Pole vault	3.60 m
2005	World Youth Championships	Marrakesh, Morocco	8th (q)	Pole vault	3.75 m
2005	Jeux de la Francophonie	Niamey, Niger	7th	Pole vault	3.40 m
2006	African Championships	Bambous, Mauritius	2nd	Pole vault	3.60 m
2007	Arab Championships	Amman, Jordan	1st	Pole vault	4.00 m
2007	Universiade	Bangkok, Poland	18th (q)	Pole vault	3.80 m
2007	Pan Arab Games	Cairo, Egypt	2nd	Pole vault	3.80 m
2008	African Championships	Addis Ababa, Ethiopia	2nd	Pole vault	3.80 m
2009	Jeux de la Francophonie	Beirut, Lebanon	4th	Pole vault	3.70 m
2009	Arab Championships	Damascus, Syria	2nd	Pole vault	3.80 m
2010	African Championships	Nairobi, Kenya	1st	Pole vault	3.70 m
2010	Continental Cup	Split, Croatia	—	Pole vault	NM
2011	Arab Championships	Al Ain, United Arab Emirates	1st	Pole vault	3.60 m
2011	Pan Arab Games	Doha, Qatar	1st	Pole vault	3.91 m
2012	African Championships	Porto-Novo, Benin	—	Pole vault	NM
2013	Arab Championships	Doha, Qatar	2nd	Pole vault	3.90 m
2013	Islamic Solidarity Games	Palembang, Indonesia	3rd	Pole vault	3.85 m
2014	African Championships	Marrakesh, Morocco	2nd	Pole vault	3.80 m
2014	Continental Cup	Marrakesh, Morocco	6th	Pole vault	3.95 m
2015	Arab Championships	Isa Town, Bahrain	2nd	Pole vault	3.70 m
2016	African Championships	Durban, South Africa	3rd	Pole vault	3.80 m

== See also ==
- List of champions of the African Championships in Athletics
