= 2014 African Championships in Athletics – Women's pole vault =

The women's pole vault event at the 2014 African Championships in Athletics was held on August 11 on Stade de Marrakech.

== Results ==
Rank	Athlete	Nationality	2.60	2.80	3.00	3.20	3.30	3.40	3.50	3.60	3.70	3.80	3.90	4.00	4.10	4.22	Result	Notes
1st place, gold medalist(s)	Syrine Balti	Tunisia	–	–	–	–	–	–	–	–	–	o	o	o	xxo	xxx	4.10	
2nd place, silver medalist(s)	Nisrine Dinar	Morocco	–	–	–	–	–	–	–	–	–	o	xxx				3.80	
3rd place, bronze medalist(s)	Dorra Mahfoudhi	Tunisia	–	–	–	–	–	xo	x–	o	o	xxx					3.70	
4	Deone Joubert	South Africa	–	–	–	–	–	o	xxo	o	xo	xxx					3.70	
5	Alima Ouattara	Ivory Coast	–	–	–	–	–	xo	o	xxx							3.50	
6	Abdelmoniem Abdelrahma	Egypt	–	–	xo	o	xo	xo	xxo	xxx							3.50	
7	Lidia Nicole Alberto	Angola	o	o	xo	xxo	xxx										3.20	
