= Nwanneka =

- Gender: Female
- Language: Igbo

Origin
- Origin: Nigeria
- Meaning: Sisterhood/brotherhood is great
- Region of origin: Igboland

Nwanneka // is a female given name of Igbo origin meaning "sisterhood/brotherhood is great".

== Notable people with this name ==
- Nwanneka Okwelogu (born May 5 1995), Nigerian track and field athlete
- Uzoamaka Nwanneka Aduba (born February 10 1981), American actress
