= 2018 African Championships in Athletics – Women's discus throw =

The women's discus throw event at the 2018 African Championships in Athletics was held on 3 August 2018 in Asaba, Nigeria.

== Results ==
Rank	Athlete	Nationality	#1	#2	#3	#4	#5	#6	Result	Notes
1st place, gold medalist(s)	Chioma Onyekwere	Nigeria	x	56.68	58.09	55.69	57.59	54.55	58.09	
2nd place, silver medalist(s)	Chinwe Okoro	Nigeria	54.34	55.83	57.37	54.68	x	x	57.37	
3rd place, bronze medalist(s)	Ischke Senekal	South Africa	x	53.82	x	51.15	x	x	53.82	
4	Riette Heyns	South Africa	50.88	50.42	52.20	52.41	51.44	51.15	52.41	
5	Jessica Inchude	Guinea-Bissau	38.16	47.72	46.07	46.45	49.44	47.17	49.44	
6	Yolandie Stander	South Africa	45.05	x	x	x	x	48.35	48.35	
7	Amira Sayed	Egypt	46.76	46.81	X	44.59	47.67	48.02	48.02	
8	Edwige Angounougou	Cameroon	38.30	41.49	42.74	44.63	41.98	43.72	44.63	
9	Roselyn Rakamba	Kenya	x	39.46	42.23				42.23	
10	Merhawit Tsehaye	Ethiopia	x	35.33	x				35.33	
