= 2018 African Championships in Athletics – Women's shot put =

The women's shot put event at the 2018 African Championships in Athletics was held on 5 August in Asaba, Nigeria.

== Results ==
Rank	Athlete	Nationality	#1	#2	#3	#4	#5	#6	Result	Notes
1st place, gold medalist(s)	Ischke Senekal	South Africa	x	15.80	16.08	17.24	16.01	x	17.24	
2nd place, silver medalist(s)	Jessica Inchude	Guinea-Bissau	15.65	16.76	16.33	16.63	x	15.81	16.76	
3rd place, bronze medalist(s)	Meike Strydom	South Africa	15.47	15.08	15.21	15.44	15.62	15.99	15.99	
4	Salome Mugabe	Mozambique	15.21	14.85	x	15.06	15.13	14.51	15.21	
5	Eucharia Ogbukwo	Nigeria	14.05	14.55	13.69	14.10	14.66	13.98	14.66	
6	Nkechi Chime	Nigeria	x	13.36	12.77	13.87	12.97	13.49	13.87	
7	Zurga Usman	Ethiopia	11.57	12.42	x	13.28	x	12.46	13.28	
8	Amira Sayed	Egypt	11.87	12.05	11.60	12.21	12.16	11.49	12.21	
9	Mariama Keita	Guinea-Bissau	10.45	10.64	10.51				10.64	
	Sali Nadounké	Burkina Faso							DNS	
