= 2012 African Championships in Athletics – Women's pole vault =

The women's pole vault at the 2012 African Championships in Athletics was held at the Stade Charles de Gaulle on 28 June.

== Medalists ==
Gold	Syrine Balti; Tunisia
Silver	Juanita Stander; South Africa
Bronze	Dorra Mahfoudhi; Tunisia
Bronze	Jeannie Van Dyk; South Africa

== Records ==
Standing records prior to the 2012 African Championships in Athletics
World record	Yelena Isinbayeva (RUS)	5.06	Zürich, Switzerland	28 August 2009
African record	Elmarie Gerryts (RSA)	4.42	Wesel, Germany	12 June 2000
Championship record	Syrine Balti (TUN)	4.21	Bambous, Mauritius	10 August 2006

== Schedule ==
Date	Time	Round
28 June 2012	15:30	Final

== Results ==
=== Final ===
Rank	Athlete	Nationality	3.20	3.30	3.40	3.50	3.60	3.70	3.80	3.85	3.90	3.95	4.00	Result	Notes
1st place, gold medalist(s)	Syrine Balti	Tunisia	–	–	o	–	o	–	o	–	–	–	xxx	3.80	
2nd place, silver medalist(s)	Juanita Stander	South Africa	–	o	o	xo	xxx							3.50	
3rd place, bronze medalist(s)	Dorra Mahfoudhi	Tunisia	o	–	o	xxx								3.40	
3rd place, bronze medalist(s)	Jeannie Van Dyk	South Africa	–	o	o	xxx								3.40	
5	Fatoumata Gnacko	Senegal	o	–	xxx									3.20	
5	Alima Sinaly Ouattara	Ivory Coast	o	xxx										3.20	
	Deone Joubert	South Africa	–	xxx										NM	
	Nisrine Dinar	Morocco	–	–	xxx									NM	
