= 2014 IAAF Continental Cup – Results =

These are the results of the 2014 IAAF Continental Cup, which took place in Marrakesh, Morocco on 13–14 September 2014.

== Men ==
=== Track ===
Events
100 m	200 m	400 m	800 m	1500 m	3000 m	5000 m	110 m h	400 m h	3000 m st	4 × 100 m relay	4 × 400 m relay

==== Men's 100 metres ====
13 September
Wind: -0.1 m/s

Rank	Lane	Athlete	Nationality	Team	Time	Points	Notes
1	6	James Dasaolu	Great Britain	Europe	10.03	8	
2	9	Mike Rodgers	United States	Americas	10.04	7	
3	7	Femi Ogunode	Qatar	Asia-Pacific	10.04	6	PB
4	8	Mark Jelks	Nigeria	Africa	10.12	5	
5	2	Christophe Lemaitre	France	Europe	10.13	4	
6	3	Zhang Peimeng	China	Asia-Pacific	10.18	3	SB
7	4	Hua Wilfried Koffi	Ivory Coast	Africa	10.22	2	
8	5	Richard Thompson	Trinidad and Tobago	Americas	10.24	1	

==== Men's 200 metres ====
14 September
Wind: +0.2 m/s

Rank	Lane	Athlete	Nationality	Team	Time	Points	Notes
1	3	Alonso Edward	Panama	Americas	19.98	8	
2	7	Rasheed Dwyer	Jamaica	Americas	19.98	7	PB
3	1	Femi Ogunode	Qatar	Asia-Pacific	20.17	6	
4	4	Christophe Lemaitre	France	Europe	20.28	5	
5	8	Serhiy Smelyk	Ukraine	Europe	20.37	4	
6	2	Isaac Makwala	Botswana	Africa	20.49	3	FS1
7	6	Hua Wilfried Koffi	Ivory Coast	Africa	20.62	2	
8	5	Masafumi Naoki	Japan	Asia-Pacific	21.12	1	

==== Men's 400 metres ====
13 September

Rank	Lane	Athlete	Nationality	Team	Time	Points	Notes
1	4	LaShawn Merritt	United States	Americas	44.60	8	
2	3	Isaac Makwala	Botswana	Africa	44.84	7	
3	2	Yousef Ahmed Masrahi	Saudi Arabia	Asia-Pacific	45.03	6	
4	7	Wayde van Niekerk	South Africa	Africa	45.27	5	
5	8	Luguelín Santos	Dominican Republic	Americas	45.34	4	
6	1	Donald Sanford	Israel	Europe	45.40	3	
7	5	Martyn Rooney	Great Britain	Europe	45.93	2	
8	6	Yuzo Kanemaru	Japan	Asia-Pacific	48.08	1	

==== Men's 800 metres ====
14 September

Rank	Athlete	Nationality	Team	Time	Points	Notes
1	Nijel Amos	Botswana	Africa	1:44.88	8	
2	Mohammed Aman	Ethiopia	Africa	1:45.34	7	
3	Adam Kszczot	Poland	Europe	1:45.72	6	
4	Mark English	Ireland	Europe	1:45.74	5	
5	Jeffrey Riseley	Australia	Asia-Pacific	1:46.20	4	
6	Duane Solomon	United States	Americas	1:46.21	3	
7	Musaeb Abdulrahman Balla	Qatar	Asia-Pacific	1:48.50	2	
8	Wesley Vazquez	Puerto Rico	Americas	1:49.32	1	

==== Men's 1500 metres ====
13 September

Rank	Athlete	Nationality	Team	Time	Points	Notes
1	Ayanleh Souleiman	Djibouti	Africa	3:48.91	8	
2	Asbel Kiprop	Kenya	Africa	3:49.10	7	
3	Mahiedine Mekhissi-Benabbad	France	Europe	3:49.53	6	
4	Henrik Ingebrigtsen	Norway	Europe	3:49.76	5	
5	Benson Seurei	Bahrain	Asia-Pacific	3:49.91	4	
6	Nick Willis	New Zealand	Asia-Pacific	3:50.00	3	
7	Leonel Manzano	United States	Americas	3:50.35	2	
8	Charles Philibert-Thiboutot	Canada	Americas	3:51.97	1	

==== Men's 3000 metres ====
14 September

Rank	Athlete	Nationality	Team	Time	Points	Notes
1	Caleb Mwangangi Ndiku	Kenya	Africa	7:52.64	8	
2	Hayle Ibrahimov	Azerbaijan	Europe	7:53.14	7	
3	Bernard Lagat	United States	Americas	7:53.95	6	
4	Nick Willis	New Zealand	Asia-Pacific	7:55.50	5	
5	Aweke Ayalew	Bahrain	Asia-Pacific	7:56.58	4	
6	Abrar Osman	Eritrea	Africa	8:01.20	3	
7	Richard Ringer	Germany	Europe	8:02.87	2	
8	Carlos dos Santos	Brazil	Americas	8:08.50	1	

==== Men's 5000 metres ====
13 September

Rank	Athlete	Nationality	Team	Time	Points	Notes
1	Isiah Kiplangat Koech	Kenya	Africa	13:26.86	8	
2	Zane Robertson	New Zealand	Asia-Pacific	13:26.86	7	
3	Nguse Amlosom	Eritrea	Africa	13:31.31	6	PB
4	Albert Kibichii Rop	Bahrain	Asia-Pacific	13:36.62	5	
5	Ali Kaya	Turkey	Europe	13:42.45	4	
6	Bouabdellah Tahri	France	Europe	13:43.95	3	
7	Andrew Bumbalough	United States	Americas	14:51.36	2	
	Iván López	Chile	Americas	DNF	0	

==== Men's 110 metres hurdles ====
14 September
Wind: +0.1 m/s

Rank	Lane	Athlete	Nationality	Team	Time	Points	Notes
1	7	Sergey Shubenkov	Russia	Europe	13.23	8	
2	6	Ronnie Ash	United States	Americas	13.25	7	
3	3	William Sharman	Great Britain	Europe	13.25	6	
4	8	Xie Wenjun	China	Asia-Pacific	13.44	5	
5	5	Tyron Akins	Nigeria	Africa	13.48	4	SB
6	4	Abdulaziz Al-Mandeel	Kuwait	Asia-Pacific	13.49	3	PB
7	2	Yordan O'Farrill	Cuba	Americas	13.67	2	
8	9	Ruan de Vries	South Africa	Africa	14.31	1	

==== Men's 400 metres hurdles ====
13 September

Rank	Lane	Athlete	Nationality	Team	Time	Points	Notes
1	6	Cornel Fredericks	South Africa	Africa	48.34	8	
2	4	Kariem Hussein	Switzerland	Europe	48.47	7	PB
3	3	Javier Culson	Puerto Rico	Americas	48.88	6	
4	8	Rasmus Mägi	Estonia	Europe	49.23	5	
5	2	Cristian Morton	Nigeria	Africa	49.23	4	
6	5	Takayuki Kishimoto	Japan	Asia-Pacific	49.78	3	
7	7	Michael Tinsley	United States	Americas	52.25	2	
8	1	Michael Cochrane	New Zealand	Asia-Pacific	52.93	1	

==== Men's 3000 metres steeplechase ====
14 September

Rank	Athlete	Nationality	Team	Time	Points	Notes
1	Jairus Kipchoge Birech	Kenya	Africa	8:13.18	8	
2	Evan Jager	United States	Americas	8:14.08	7	
3	Abubaker Ali Kamal	Qatar	Asia-Pacific	8:14.08	6	SB
4	Chala Beyo	Ethiopia	Africa	8:25.45	5	PB
5	John Kibet Koech	Bahrain	Asia-Pacific	8:25.45	4	
6	Ivan Lukyanov	Russia	Europe	8:29.91	3	
7	Matthew Hughes	Canada	Americas	8:40.10	2	
8	Krystian Zalewski	Poland	Europe	8:47.68	1	

==== Men's 4 × 100 metres relay ====
13 September

Rank	Lane	Team	Athlete	Time	Points	Notes
1	3	Americas	Kim Collins (SKN), Mike Rodgers (USA), Nesta Carter (JAM), Richard Thompson (TRI)	37.97	15	
2	4	Europe	James Ellington (GBR), Harry Aikines-Aryeetey (GBR), Richard Kilty (GBR), Christophe Lemaitre (FRA)	38.62	11	
3	6	Africa	Mark Jelks (NGR), Monzavous Edwards (NGR), Obinna Metu (NGR), Ogho-Oghene Egwero (NGR)	38.62	7	
4	5	Asia-Pacific	Kazuma Oseto (JPN), Kotaro Taniguchi (JPN), Masafumi Naoki (JPN), Yu Onabuta (JPN)	39.50	3	

==== Men's 4 × 400 metres relay ====
14 September

Rank	Team	Athlete	Time	Points	Notes
1	Africa	Boniface Mucheru Tumuti (KEN), Isaac Makwala (BOT), Saviour Kombe (ZAM), Wayde van Niekerk (RSA)	3:00.02	15	
2	Europe	Conrad Williams (GBR), Jakub Krzewina (POL), Donald Sanford (ISR), Martyn Rooney (GBR)	3:00.10	11	
3	Americas	Javier Culson (PUR), Chris Brown (BAH), Kim Collins (SKN), LaShawn Merritt (USA)	3:02.78	7	
4	Asia-Pacific	Tomoya Tamura (JPN), Takamasa Kitagawa (JPN), Kaisei Yui (JPN), Julian Jrummi Walsh (JPN)	3:03.77	3	

=== Field ===
Events
High jump	Pole vault	Long jump	Triple jump	Shot put	Discus throw	Hammer throw	Javelin throw

==== Men's high jump ====
13 September

Rank	Athlete	Nationality	Team	2.13	2.18	2.23	2.27	2.31	2.34	2.37	2.43	Result	Points	Notes
1	Bohdan Bondarenko	Ukraine	Europe	–	–	–	o	–	xxo	o	xxx	2.37	8	
DQ	~~Ivan Ukhov~~	~~Russia~~	~~Europe~~	–	o	–	o	–	xo	xx		~~2.34~~	~~7~~	
2	Mutaz Essa Barshim	Qatar	Asia-Pacific	–	–	o	xo	–	xxo	xxx		2.34	7	
3	Derek Drouin	Canada	Americas	–	o	o	o	xo	xxx			2.31	6	
4	Erik Kynard	United States	Americas	–	o	o	xo	xxo	xxx			2.31	5	
5	Zhang Guowei	China	Asia-Pacific	o	o	o	o	xxx				2.27	4	
6	Fernand Djouméssi	Cameroon	Africa	xxo	x–	o	xx–	x				2.23	3	
7	Kabelo Kgosiemang	Botswana	Africa	o	o	x–	xx					2.18	2	

==== Men's pole vault ====
14 September

Rank	Athlete	Nationality	Team	4.80	5.00	5.20	5.40	5.55	5.65	5.70	5.80	5.90	Result	Points	Notes
1	Renaud Lavillenie	France	Europe	–	–	–	–	–	o	–	xxo	xxx	5.80	8	
2	Xue Changrui	China	Asia-Pacific	–	–	–	xo	xo	xxo	xxx			5.65	7	
3	Mark Hollis	United States	Americas	–	xxo	o	xo	xxo	xxx				5.55	6	
4	Augusto de Oliveira	Brazil	Americas	–	–	–	o	xxx					5.40	5	
5	Paweł Wojciechowski	Poland	Europe	–	–	o	xo	xxx					5.40	4	
6	Cheyne Rahme	South Africa	Africa	–	–	o	xxx						5.20	3	
7	Joel Pocklington	Australia	Asia-Pacific	o	xo	xxo	xxx						5.20	2	
8	Mohamed Romdhana	Tunisia	Africa	xo	xo	xxx							5.00	1	

==== Men's long jump ====
13 September

Rank	Athlete	Nationality	Team	#1	#2	#3	#4	Result	Points	Notes
1	Ignisious Gaisah	Netherlands	Europe	7.87	8.11	x	8.00	8.11	8	
2	Will Claye	United States	Americas	x	7.98	x	x	7.98	7	
3	Zarck Visser	South Africa	Africa	7.96	7.89	6.26	7.80	7.96	6	
4	Henry Frayne	Australia	Asia-Pacific	x	x	x	7.95	7.95	5	
5	Li Jinzhe	China	Asia-Pacific	x	x	7.82	x	7.82	4	
6	Robert Martey	Ghana	Africa	x	7.59	x	7.76	7.76	3	
7	Luis Rivera	Mexico	Americas	7.75	x	x	7.52	7.75	2	
8	Kafétien Gomis	France	Europe	x	x	7.48	7.67	7.67	1	

==== Men's triple jump ====
14 September

Rank	Athlete	Nationality	Team	#1	#2	#3	#4	Result	Points	Notes
1	Benjamin Compaoré	France	Europe	17.26	17.48	17.23	x	17.48	8	PB
2	Godfrey Khotso Mokoena	South Africa	Africa	17.13	17.35	x	16.72	17.35	7	NR
3	Will Claye	United States	Americas	16.87	17.20	17.21	17.18	17.21	6	
4	Tosin Oke	Nigeria	Africa	16.24	16.62	16.89	16.68	16.89	5	
5	Cao Shuo	China	Asia-Pacific	16.74	15.54	16.83	16.58	16.83	4	
6	Lyukman Adams	Russia	Europe	16.29	16.42	16.82	16.14	16.82	3	
7	Jonathan Henrique Silva	Brazil	Americas	16.04	15.82	16.01	14.70	16.04	2	
8	Renjith Maheswary	India	Asia-Pacific	15.91	x	13.82	15.67	15.91	1	

==== Men's shot put ====
13 September

Rank	Athlete	Nationality	Team	#1	#2	#3	#4	Result	Points	Notes
1	David Storl	Germany	Europe	20.43	21.19	x	21.55	21.55	8	
2	O'Dayne Richards	Jamaica	Americas	19.26	21.10	x	20.76	21.10	7	
3	Joe Kovacs	United States	Americas	19.90	20.87	x	x	20.87	6	
4	Tomas Walsh	New Zealand	Asia-Pacific	20.55	x	20.70	20.06	20.70	5	
5	Tomasz Majewski	Poland	Europe	19.39	20.19	20.17	20.35	20.35	4	
6	Orazio Cremona	South Africa	Africa	18.21	19.41	19.29	19.96	19.96	3	
7	Franck Elemba	Republic of the Congo	Africa	18.68	19.72	19.13	19.35	19.72	2	NR
8	Sultan Al-Hebshi	Saudi Arabia	Asia-Pacific	18.82	19.09	x	x	19.09	1	

==== Men's discus throw ====
14 September

Rank	Athlete	Nationality	Team	#1	#2	#3	#4	Result	Points	Notes
1	Gerd Kanter	Estonia	Europe	62.91	63.86	63.79	64.46	64.46	8	
2	Jorge Fernández	Cuba	Americas	61.32	61.57	62.12	62.97	62.97	7	
3	Jason Morgan	Jamaica	Americas	62.70	59.75	59.55	59.27	62.70	6	
4	Victor Hogan	South Africa	Africa	62.69	62.42	x	x	62.69	5	
5	Benn Harradine	Australia	Asia-Pacific	61.04	x	61.97	x	61.97	4	
6	Robert Urbanek	Poland	Europe	58.62	x	60.27	59.77	60.27	3	
7	Stephen Mozia	Nigeria	Africa	50.17	57.31	x	x	57.31	2	
8	Sultan Al-Dawoodi	Saudi Arabia	Asia-Pacific	x	x	55.51	56.73	56.73	1	

==== Men's hammer throw ====
13 September

Rank	Athlete	Nationality	Team	#1	#2	#3	#4	Result	Points	Notes
1	Krisztián Pars	Hungary	Europe	78.96	78.99	78.66	77.55	78.99	8	
2	Mostafa El Gamel	Egypt	Africa	75.33	78.24	76.83	78.89	78.89	7	
3	Paweł Fajdek	Poland	Europe	x	78.05	74.88	x	78.05	6	
4	Dilshod Nazarov	Tajikistan	Asia-Pacific	75.29	x	77.06	76.79	77.06	5	
5	Ali Al-Zinkawi	Kuwait	Asia-Pacific	71.96	72.24	71.50	70.30	72.24	4	
6	Roberto Janet	Cuba	Americas	71.89	x	71.98	x	71.98	3	
7	Chris Harmse	South Africa	Africa	67.76	x	71.41	71.71	71.71	2	
8	Kibwe Johnson	United States	Americas	71.36	68.69	x	x	71.36	1	

==== Men's javelin throw ====
14 September

Rank	Athlete	Nationality	Team	#1	#2	#3	#4	Result	Points	Notes
1	Ihab El Sayed	Egypt	Africa	81.77	85.44	79.28	83.33	85.44	8	
2	Vítězslav Veselý	Czech Republic	Europe	x	83.13	83.77	78.63	83.77	7	
3	Keshorn Walcott	Trinidad and Tobago	Americas	81.02	x	x	83.52	83.52	6	
4	Julius Yego	Kenya	Africa	80.24	80.30	77.73	83.06	83.06	5	
5	Tim Glover	United States	Americas	73.18	71.59	73.61	79.67	79.67	4	
6	Joshua Robinson	Australia	Asia-Pacific	74.25	76.05	78.58	x	78.58	3	
7	Ivan Zaytsev	Uzbekistan	Asia-Pacific	x	78.37	x	76.91	78.37	2	
8	Antti Ruuskanen	Finland	Europe	70.84	x	77.78	77.07	77.78	1	

== Women ==
=== Track ===
Events
100 m	200 m	400 m	800 m	1500 m	3000 m	5000 m	100 m h	400 m h	3000 m st	4 × 100 m relay	4 × 400 m relay

==== Women's 100 metres ====
13 September
Wind: -1.5 m/s

Rank	Lane	Athlete	Nationality	Team	Time	Points	Notes
1	3	Veronica Campbell Brown	Jamaica	Americas	11.08	8	
2	7	Michelle-Lee Ahye	Trinidad and Tobago	Americas	11.25	7	
3	5	Dafne Schippers	Netherlands	Europe	11.26	6	
4	4	Marie-Josée Ta Lou	Ivory Coast	Africa	11.28	5	
5	9	Myriam Soumaré	France	Europe	11.28	4	
6	8	Gloria Asumnu	Nigeria	Africa	11.37	3	
7	6	Olga Safronova	Kazakhstan	Asia-Pacific	11.60	2	
8	2	Melissa Breen	Australia	Asia-Pacific	11.75	1	

==== Women's 200 metres ====
14 September
Wind: +0.3 m/s

Rank	Lane	Athlete	Nationality	Team	Time	Points	Notes
1	3	Dafne Schippers	Netherlands	Europe	22.28	8	
2	5	Joanna Atkins	United States	Americas	22.53	7	
3	7	Myriam Soumaré	France	Europe	22.58	6	
4	1	Anthonique Strachan	Bahamas	Americas	22.73	5	
5	6	Marie-Josée Ta Lou	Ivory Coast	Africa	22.78	4	PB
6	4	Olga Safronova	Kazakhstan	Asia-Pacific	22.99	3	
7	2	Dominique Duncan	Nigeria	Africa	23.63	2	
8	8	Melissa Breen	Australia	Asia-Pacific	23.81	1	

==== Women's 400 metres ====
13 September

Rank	Lane	Athlete	Nationality	Team	Time	Points	Notes
1	6	Francena McCorory	United States	Americas	49.94	8	
2	2	Novlene Williams-Mills	Jamaica	Americas	50.08	7	
3	4	Libania Grenot	Italy	Europe	50.60	6	
4	7	Kabange Mupopo	Zambia	Africa	50.87	5	NR
5	8	Olha Zemlyak	Ukraine	Europe	51.00	4	PB
6	3	Folasade Abugan	Nigeria	Africa	51.78	3	
7	5	Anneliese Rubie	Australia	Asia-Pacific	54.33	2	
8	1	Louise Jones	New Zealand	Asia-Pacific	55.07	1	

==== Women's 800 metres ====
13 September

Rank	Athlete	Nationality	Team	Time	Points	Notes
1	Eunice Jepkoech Sum	Kenya	Africa	1:58.21	8	
2	Ajeé Wilson	United States	Americas	2:00.07	7	
3	Marina Arzamasova	Belarus	Europe	2:00.31	6	
4	Tigist Assefa	Ethiopia	Africa	2:00.57	5	
5	Lynsey Sharp	Great Britain	Europe	2:00.80	4	
6	Sahily Diago	Cuba	Americas	2:00.96	3	
7	Angie Smit	New Zealand	Asia-Pacific	2:02.37	2	
8	Tintu Lukka	India	Asia-Pacific	2:03.13	1	

==== Women's 1500 metres ====
14 September

Rank	Athlete	Nationality	Team	Time	Points	Notes
1	Sifan Hassan	Netherlands	Europe	4:05.99	8	
2	Shannon Rowbury	United States	Americas	4:07.21	7	
3	Dawit Seyaum	Ethiopia	Africa	4:07.61	6	
4	Hellen Onsando Obiri	Kenya	Africa	4:08.15	5	
5	Renata Pliś	Poland	Europe	4:08.68	4	
6	Mimi Belete	Bahrain	Asia-Pacific	4:09.14	3	
7	Nicole Sifuentes	Canada	Americas	4:11.18	2	
8	Selma Kajan	Australia	Asia-Pacific	4:19.61	1	

==== Women's 3000 metres ====
13 September

Rank	Athlete	Nationality	Team	Time	Points	Notes
1	Genzebe Dibaba	Ethiopia	Africa	8:57.53	8	
2	Meraf Bahta	Sweden	Europe	8:58.48	7	
3	Susan Kuijken	Netherlands	Europe	9:01.41	6	
4	Janet Kisa	Kenya	Africa	9:01.72	5	
5	Mimi Belete	Bahrain	Asia-Pacific	9:04.11	4	
6	Gabrielle Grunewald	United States	Americas	9:04.11	3	
7	Jessica O'Connell	Canada	Americas	9:11.04	2	
8	Yuika Mori	Japan	Asia-Pacific	9:31.10	1	

==== Women's 5000 metres ====
14 September

Rank	Athlete	Nationality	Team	Time	Points	Notes
1	Almaz Ayana	Ethiopia	Africa	15:33.32	8	
2	Joyce Chepkirui	Kenya	Africa	15:58.31	7	PB
3	Joanne Pavey	Great Britain	Europe	15:58.67	6	
4	Eloise Wellings	Australia	Asia-Pacific	16:00.14	5	
5	Clémence Calvin	France	Europe	16:03.31	4	
6	Brenda Flores	Mexico	Americas	16:19.07	3	
7	Tejitu Daba	Bahrain	Asia-Pacific	16:37.62	2	
8	Katie Mackey	United States	Americas	17:06.25	1	

==== Women's 100 metres hurdles ====
14 September
Wind: +0.7 m/s

Rank	Lane	Athlete	Nationality	Team	Time	Points	Notes
1	4	Dawn Harper-Nelson	United States	Americas	12.47	8	CR
2	6	Tiffany Porter	Great Britain	Europe	12.51	7	NR
3	2	Cindy Roleder	Germany	Europe	13.02	6	
4	8	LaVonne Idlette	Dominican Republic	Americas	13.06	5	
5	5	Rikenette Steenkamp	South Africa	Africa	13.16	4	PB
6	3	Ayako Kimura	Japan	Asia-Pacific	13.17	3	
7	9	Amaka Ogoegbunam	Nigeria	Africa	13.59	2	
8	7	Sarah Cowley	New Zealand	Asia-Pacific	15.30	1	SB

==== Women's 400 metres hurdles ====
13 September

Rank	Lane	Athlete	Nationality	Team	Time	Points	Notes
1	5	Kaliese Spencer	Jamaica	Americas	53.81	8	
2	3	Eilidh Child	Great Britain	Europe	54.42	7	
3	4	Adekoya Oluwakemi	Bahrain	Asia-Pacific	54.70	6	
4	7	Hanna Titimets	Ukraine	Europe	55.20	5	
5	6	Wenda Nel	South Africa	Africa	55.80	4	
6	2	Amaka Ogoegbunam	Nigeria	Africa	55.83	3	
7	1	Kori Carter	United States	Americas	56.80	2	
8	8	Lauren Wells	Australia	Asia-Pacific	57.09	1	

==== Women's 3000 metres steeplechase ====
14 September

Rank	Athlete	Nationality	Team	Time	Points	Notes
1	Emma Coburn	United States	Americas	9:50.67	8	
2	Hiwot Ayalew	Ethiopia	Africa	9:51.59	7	
3	Ruth Jebet	Bahrain	Asia-Pacific	9:55.24	6	
4	Sviatlana Kudzelich	Belarus	Europe	9:56.31	5	
5	Charlotta Fougberg	Sweden	Europe	10:07.62	4	
6	Salima Elouali Alami	Morocco	Africa	10:08.35	3	
7	Jessica Furlan	Canada	Americas	10:16.51	2	
8	Stella Radford	Australia	Asia-Pacific	11:07.02	1	

==== Women's 4 × 100 metres relay ====
13 September

Rank	Lane	Team	Athletes	Time	Points	Notes
1	5	Americas	Tianna Bartoletta (USA), Michelle-Lee Ahye (TRI), Samantha Henry-Robinson (JAM), Veronica Campbell Brown (JAM)	42.44	15	
2	3	Europe	Asha Philip (GBR), Ashleigh Nelson (GBR), Anyika Onuora (GBR), Desirèe Henry (GBR)	42.98	11	
3	4	Asia-Pacific	Yuki Miyazawa (JPN), Mizuki Nakamura (JPN), Tomoka Tsuchihashi (JPN), Yuki Jimbo (JPN)	45.40	7	
	6	Africa	Gloria Asumnu (NGR), Marie-Josée Ta Lou (CIV), Dominique Duncan (NGR), Justine Palframan (RSA)	DQ	0	R170.7

==== Women's 4 × 400 metres relay ====
14 September

Rank	Team	Athletes	Time	Points	Notes
1	Americas	Christine Day (JAM), Francena McCorory (USA), Stephenie Ann McPherson (JAM), Novlene Williams-Mills (JAM)	3:20.93	15	WL
2	Europe	Indira Terrero (ESP), Małgorzata Hołub (POL), Olha Zemlyak (UKR), Libania Grenot (ITA)	3:24.12	11	
3	Africa	Patience Okon George (NGR), Folasade Abugan (NGR), Ada Benjamin (NGR), Kabange Mupopo (ZAM)	3:25.51	7	
4	Asia-Pacific	Jessica Thornton (AUS), Anneliese Rubie (AUS), Lauren Wells (AUS), Lyndsay Pekin (AUS)	3:36.89	3	

=== Field ===
Events
High jump	Pole vault	Long jump	Triple jump	Shot put	Discus throw	Hammer throw	Javelin throw

==== Women's high jump ====
14 September

Rank	Athlete	Nationality	Team	1.69	1.74	1.79	1.83	1.87	1.90	1.93	1.95	1.97	1.99	2.01	Result	Points	Notes
1	Maria Kuchina	Russia	Europe	o	–	o	o	o	o	o	o	o	xo	xxx	1.99	8	
2	Chaunté Lowe	United States	Americas	–	–	o	o	xo	o	xo	xxo	o	xxx		1.97	7	SB
3	Ana Šimić	Croatia	Europe	–	–	–	o	o	o	o	o	xxx			1.95	6	
4	Svetlana Radzivil	Uzbekistan	Asia-Pacific	–	–	o	o	o	o	xxo	xxx				1.93	5	
5	Levern Spencer	Saint Lucia	Americas	–	–	o	–	xo	x–	xx					1.87	4	
6	Rhizlane Siba	Morocco	Africa	o	o	o	xxx								1.79	3	
7	Sarah Cowley	New Zealand	Asia-Pacific	o	o	xo	xxx								1.79	2	
8	Basant Mosaad Mohamed Hassan	Egypt	Africa	o	xx										1.69	1	

==== Women's pole vault ====
13 September

Rank	Athlete	Nationality	Team	3.55	3.75	3.95	4.15	4.30	4.45	4.55	4.66	Result	Points	Notes
1	Li Ling	China	Asia-Pacific	–	–	–	xo	o	o	xxo	xxx	4.55	8	
2	Angelina Zhuk-Krasnova	Russia	Europe	–	–	–	o	xo	o	xxx		4.45	7	
3	Lisa Ryzih	Germany	Europe	–	–	–	o	xo	xxx			4.30	5.5	
3	Alana Boyd	Australia	Asia-Pacific	–	–	–	o	xo	xxx			4.30	5.5	
5	Becky Holliday	United States	Americas	–	–	–	xxo	xxo	xxx			4.30	4	
6	Nisrine Dinar	Morocco	Africa	o	o	o	xxx					3.95	3	SB
7	Syrine Ebondo	Tunisia	Africa	–	xo	xo	xxx					3.95	2	
	Fabiana Murer	Brazil	Americas	–	–	–	–	–	xxx			NM	0	

==== Women's long jump ====
14 September

Rank	Athlete	Nationality	Team	#1	#2	#3	#4	Result	Points	Notes
1	Éloyse Lesueur	France	Europe	x	x	x	6.66	6.66	8	
2	Ivana Španović	Serbia	Europe	x	6.41	6.56	6.53	6.56	7	
3	Tianna Bartoletta	United States	Americas	6.34	x	6.45	x	6.45	6	
4	Christabel Nettey	Canada	Americas	x	6.34	6.11	6.35	6.35	5	
5	Ese Brume	Nigeria	Africa	x	6.31	6.34	6.24	6.34	4	
6	Joelle Mbumi Nkouindjin	Cameroon	Africa	5.78	5.94	6.10	6.23	6.23	3	
7	Lu Minjia	China	Asia-Pacific	x	6.14	x	x	6.14	2	
8	Margaret Gayen	Australia	Asia-Pacific	5.19	5.88	5.92	5.82	5.92	1	

==== Women's triple jump ====
13 September

Rank	Athlete	Nationality	Team	#1	#2	#3	#4	Result	Points	Notes
1	Caterine Ibargüen	Colombia	Americas	14.30	14.43	14.52	–	14.52	8	
2	Ekaterina Koneva	Russia	Europe	x	14.27	14.03	14.16	14.27	7	
3	Olga Saladukha	Ukraine	Europe	14.25	14.24	14.26	14.04	14.26	6	
4	Kimberly Williams	Jamaica	Americas	13.91	13.80	13.93	13.90	13.93	5	
5	Li Yanmei	China	Asia-Pacific	x	13.37	13.35	13.12	13.37	4	
6	Joelle Mbumi Nkouindjin	Cameroon	Africa	13.34	13.22	12.54	12.81	13.34	3	
7	Nadia Eke	Ghana	Africa	12.80	12.76	13.28	12.91	13.28	2	PB
8	Linda Leverton	Australia	Asia-Pacific	12.59	13.03	13.10	x	13.10	1	

==== Women's shot put ====
14 September

Rank	Athlete	Nationality	Team	#1	#2	#3	#4	Result	Points	Notes
1	Christina Schwanitz	Germany	Europe	19.94	20.02	19.92	x	20.02	8	
2	Michelle Carter	United States	Americas	18.76	19.84	19.74	19.21	19.84	7	SB
3	Gong Lijiao	China	Asia-Pacific	19.23	18.72	x	19.20	19.23	6	
4	Yevgeniya Kolodko	Russia	Europe	18.80	x	x	x	18.80	5	
5	Cleopatra Borel	Trinidad and Tobago	Americas	18.63	18.40	18.68	18.65	18.68	4	
6	Chinwe Okoro	Nigeria	Africa	14.74	15.91	x	16.35	16.35	3	
7	Auriol Dongmo Mekemnang	Cameroon	Africa	15.67	15.32	15.74	15.77	15.77	2	
	Valerie Adams	New Zealand	Asia-Pacific					DNS	0	

==== Women's discus throw ====
14 September

Rank	Athlete	Nationality	Team	#1	#2	#3	#4	Result	Points	Notes
1	Gia Lewis-Smallwood	United States	Americas	64.48	63.84	64.55	62.41	64.55	8	
2	Dani Samuels	Australia	Asia-Pacific	62.12	64.39	63.31	64.07	64.39	7	
3	Sandra Perković	Croatia	Europe	60.13	x	61.73	62.08	62.08	6	
4	Mélina Robert-Michon	France	Europe	59.79	61.89	58.80	59.64	61.89	5	
5	Yaime Pérez	Cuba	Americas	x	59.38	59.34	x	59.38	4	
6	Yang Yanbo	China	Asia-Pacific	x	55.98	x	53.81	55.98	3	
7	Chinwe Okoro	Nigeria	Africa	x	51.33	x	52.30	52.30	2	
8	Amina Moudden	Morocco	Africa	47.47	49.07	49.00	x	49.07	1	

==== Women's hammer throw ====
14 September

Rank	Athlete	Nationality	Team	#1	#2	#3	#4	Result	Points	Notes
1	Anita Włodarczyk	Poland	Europe	72.83	74.26	75.21	72.33	75.21	8	
2	Amanda Bingson	United States	Americas	x	72.38	x	x	72.38	7	
3	Martina Hrašnová	Slovakia	Europe	67.39	70.47	x	x	70.47	6	
4	Wang Zheng	China	Asia-Pacific	x	67.77	x	70.15	70.47	5	
5	Sultana Frizell	Canada	Americas	68.34	68.43	69.61	70.06	70.06	4	
6	Amy Séné	Senegal	Africa	58.50	x	59.18	x	59.18	3	
7	Lætitia Bambara	Burkina Faso	Africa	x	54.28	x	58.22	58.22	2	
8	Natalie Debeljuh	Australia	Asia-Pacific	x	53.73	52.87	51.35	53.73	1	

==== Women's javelin throw ====
13 September

Rank	Athlete	Nationality	Team	#1	#2	#3	#4	Result	Points	Notes
1	Barbora Špotáková	Czech Republic	Europe	62.06	62.17	65.52	62.23	65.52	8	
2	Sunette Viljoen	South Africa	Africa	62.28	63.16	63.76	56.70	63.76	7	
3	Elizabeth Gleadle	Canada	Americas	61.38	60.98	59.26	60.82	61.38	6	
4	Kimberley Mickle	Australia	Asia-Pacific	58.75	61.33	x	60.67	61.33	5	
5	Linda Stahl	Germany	Europe	x	56.22	58.27	60.14	60.14	4	
6	Zhang Li	China	Asia-Pacific	54.55	55.63	59.27	56.40	59.27	3	
7	Kara Patterson	United States	Americas	52.19	50.86	x	52.22	52.22	2	
8	Zuta Mary Nartey	Ghana	Africa	45.34	49.84	x	38.31	49.84	1	
