= Athletics at the 2007 All-Africa Games – Women's pole vault =

The women's pole vault at the 2007 All-Africa Games was held on July 19.

== Results ==
Rank	Athlete	Nationality	Result	Notes
1st place, gold medalist(s)	Leila Ben Youssef	Tunisia	3.85	
2nd place, silver medalist(s)	Ahmed Eman Nesrim	Egypt	3.60	
3rd place, bronze medalist(s)	Eva Thornton	South Africa	3.30	
	Sonia Halliche	Algeria	NM	
	Ouahiba Hameras	Algeria	NM	

== Bibliography ==
- Results
