= 2014 African Championships in Athletics – Women's discus throw =

The women's discus throw event at the 2014 African Championships in Athletics was held on August 12 on Stade de Marrakech.

== Results ==
Rank	Athlete	Nationality	#1	#2	#3	#4	#5	#6	Result	Notes
1st place, gold medalist(s)	Chinwe Okoro	Nigeria	x	53.09	54.78	54.63	59.79	x	59.79	CR
2nd place, silver medalist(s)	Nwanneka Okwelogu	Nigeria	51.07	50.78	47.69	49.32	50.25	51.66	51.66	
3rd place, bronze medalist(s)	Amina Moudden	Morocco	48.21	46.94	46.53	44.98	43.09	x	48.21	
4	Julia Agawu	Ghana	x	44.69	47.13	47.34	47.68	43.75	47.68	NR
5	Alifatou Djibril	Togo	46.72	x	46.71	x	47.17	45.99	47.17	
6	Elizna Naudé	South Africa	x	41.66	43.85	x	x	44.44	44.44	
7	Fadya Saad El Kasaby	Egypt	42.91	39.19	42.28	41.78	x	41.30	42.91	
8	Auriol Dongmo Mekemnang	Cameroon	40.82	41.35	40.57	41.34	–	–	41.35	
9	Fanny Virgile Ossala	Republic of the Congo	29.92	32.28	35.94				35.94	
10	Gebreegziabher Tsadik	Ethiopia	33.46	34.07	33.67				34.07	
