= 2016 African Championships in Athletics – Women's pole vault =

The women's pole vault event at the 2016 African Championships in Athletics was held on 23 June in Kings Park Stadium.

== Results ==
Rank	Athlete	Nationality	Result	Notes
1st place, gold medalist(s)	Syrine Balti	Tunisia	4.00	
2nd place, silver medalist(s)	Dora Mahfoudhi	Tunisia	3.80	
3rd place, bronze medalist(s)	Nisrine Dinar	Morocco	3.80	
4	Alima Ouattara	Ivory Coast	3.50	
5	Dina Eltabaa	Egypt	3.50	
6	Christie Nell	South Africa	3.40	
7	Jodie Sedras	South Africa	3.30	
8	Asli Lamley	South Africa	3.30	
9	Nancy Cheekoussen	Mauritius	3.10	
