= 2014 African Championships in Athletics – Women's shot put =

The women's shot put event at the 2014 African Championships in Athletics was held on August 14 on Stade de Marrakech.

== Results ==
Rank	Athlete	Nationality	#1	#2	#3	#4	#5	#6	Result	Notes
1st place, gold medalist(s)	Auriol Dongmo Mekemnang	Cameroon	15.83	16.50	16.05	16.84	x	x	16.84	NR
2nd place, silver medalist(s)	Chinwe Okoro	Nigeria	15.79	16.05	16.40	x	15.73	x	16.40	
3rd place, bronze medalist(s)	Lezaan Jordaan	South Africa	x	14.99	x	15.31	x	x	15.31	
4	Nwanneka Okwelogu	Nigeria	14.50	14.06	14.43	x	15.14	14.65	15.14	
5	Alifatou Djibril	Togo	13.33	14.38	14.43	14.89	x	14.31	14.89	
6	Fadya Saad El Kasaby	Egypt	12.12	12.34	12.75	12.57	12.45	13.06	13.06	
7	Julia Agawu	Ghana	12.90	12.83	x	x	x	12.34	12.90	
8	Amele Yebeltal	Ethiopia	10.54	10.61	11.34	x	10.65	10.95	11.34	
