= 2016 African Championships in Athletics – Women's shot put =

The women's shot put event at the 2016 African Championships in Athletics was held on 26 June in Kings Park Stadium.

== Results ==
Rank	Athlete	Nationality	Result	Notes
1st place, gold medalist(s)	Auriol Dongmo Mekemnang	Cameroon	17.64	CR
2nd place, silver medalist(s)	Nwanneka Okwelogu	Nigeria	17.07	
3rd place, bronze medalist(s)	Chioma Onyekwere	Nigeria	15.71	
4	Jessica Inchude	Guinea-Bissau	15.44	
5	Ischke Senekal	South Africa	15.07	
6	Lezaan Jordaan	South Africa	14.82	
7	Salome Mugabe	Mozambique	14.31	
8	Amele Yebeltal	Ethiopia	12.86	NR
9	Andrea Vahoua	Ivory Coast	11.99	
10	Conette Smith	Namibia	10.77	
11	Savana Ager	Zimbabwe	8.10	
