= Amina Moudden =

Moroccan discus thrower

Medal record

Women's athletics

Representing Morocco

African Championships
| Bronze medal – third place | 2014 Marrakesh | Discus throw |

Amina Moudden (born 3 January 1984) is a Moroccan discus thrower.

Following success on regional junior level, she won the bronze medal at the 2003 North African Championships and the silver medal at the 2004 Pan Arab Games. After a lengthy hiatus from the international limelight she won the bronze medal at the 2014 African Championships, gold medal at the 2015 Arab Championships, finished eighth at the 2016 African Championships, won the silver medal at the 2017 Islamic Solidarity Games and the gold medal at the 2017 Arab Championships.

Globally she represented Africa at the 2014 Continental Cup, finishing eighth. Her personal best throw is 52.64 metres, achieved in October 2004 at the Pan Arab Games in Algiers.
