= 2026 African Championships in Athletics – Women's pole vault =

Women's pole vault at the 2026 African Championships in Athletics
- Venue: Legon Sports Stadium
- Location: Accra, Ghana
- Dates: 14 May
- Competitors: 5 from 4 nations
- Winning time: 4.30

Medalists
gold medal	Ansume de Beer	South Africa
silver medal	Dorra Mahfoudhi	Tunisia
bronze medal	Talaya Vorster	Namibia
bronze medal	Tamer Reem	Egypt

The women's pole vault event at the 2026 African Championships in Athletics was held on 14 May in Accra, Ghana.

== Results ==
Rank	Athlete	Nationality	3.00	3.20	3.30	3.40	3.50	3.60	3.70	3.90	4.30	4.40	Result	Notes
1st place, gold medalist(s)	Ansume de Beer	South Africa							o	o	o	xxx	4.30	CR, AU20R
2nd place, silver medalist(s)	Dorra Mahfoudhi	Tunisia	–	–	–	–	xo	o	o	x			3.70	
3rd place, bronze medalist(s)	Talaya Vorster	Namibia	–	–	o	o	o	xxx					3.50	
3rd place, bronze medalist(s)	Tamer Reem	Egypt	o	o	o	o	o	xxx					3.50	
	Rasha Tamer Tawfik	Egypt											NM	
