= Ischke Senekal =

South African discus thrower (born 1993)

Medal record

Women's athletics

Representing South Africa

African Championships
Gold medal – first place	2018 Asaba	Shot put
Bronze medal – third place	2018 Asaba	Discus throw

Ischke Senekal (born 8 January 1993) is a South African discus thrower.

She won the silver medal at the 2015 African Games (discus), finished fifth at the 2015 African Games (shot put), twelfth at the 2015 Summer Universiade (discus), fifth at the 2016 African Championships (both discus and (shot put) and tenth at the 2017 Summer Universiade (discus).

She also competed at the 2012 World Junior Championships (discus) and the 2017 Summer Universiade (shot put) without reaching the final.

Her personal best throw is 56.86 metres, achieved in April 2016 in Stellenbosch. She has 17.56 metres in the shot put, achieved in April 2018 in Sasolburg.

== International competitions ==
Year	Competition	Venue	Position	Event	Notes
Representing South Africa
2011	African Junior Championships	Gaborone, Botswana	4th	Shot put	12.53 m
2011	African Junior Championships	Gaborone, Botswana	1st	Discus throw	49.90 m
2012	World Junior Championships	Barcelona, Spain	24th (q)	Discus throw	45.33 m
2015	Universiade	Gwangju, South Korea	12th	Discus throw	50.53 m
2015	African Games	Brazzaville, Republic of the Congo	5th	Shot put	13.64 m
2015	African Games	Brazzaville, Republic of the Congo	2nd	Discus throw	50.53 m
2016	African Championships	Durban, South Africa	5th	Shot put	15.07 m
2016	African Championships	Durban, South Africa	5th	Discus throw	50.16 m
2017	Universiade	Taipei, Taiwan	16th (q)	Shot put	14.86 m
2017	Universiade	Taipei, Taiwan	10th	Discus throw	52.87 m
2018	World Cup	London, United Kingdom	4th	Shot put	17.54 m
2018	World Cup	London, United Kingdom	7th	Discus throw	55.54 m
2018	African Championships	Asaba, Nigeria	1st	Shot put	17.24 m
2018	African Championships	Asaba, Nigeria	3rd	Discus throw	53.82 m
2019	African Games	Rabat, Morocco	1st	Shot put	16.18 m
2019	African Games	Rabat, Morocco	3rd	Discus throw	53.95 m
2022	African Championships	Port Louis, Mauritius	1st	Shot put	16.40 m
2022	World Championships	Eugene, United States	29th (q)	Shot put	15.40 m
2023	World Championships	Budapest, Hungary	32nd (q)	Shot put	16.20 m
2024	African Games	Accra, Ghana	3rd	Shot put	16.38 m
2024	African Games	Accra, Ghana	8th	Discus throw	51.32 m
