= 2010 African Championships in Athletics – Women's pole vault =

The women's pole vault at the 2010 African Championships in Athletics was held on July 31.

== Results ==
Rank	Athlete	Nationality	2.40	2.60	2.80	3.00	3.20	3.30	3.40	3.50	3.60	3.70	4.00	Result	Notes
1st place, gold medalist(s)	Nisrine Dinar	Morocco	–	–	–	–	–	–	–	–	o	o	xxx	3.70	
2nd place, silver medalist(s)	Laetitia Berthier	Burundi	–	–	–	–	–	o	–	o	–	xxx		3.50	
3rd place, bronze medalist(s)	Sinali Alima Outtara	Ivory Coast	–	–	–	o	xo	o	o	xxx				3.40	
4	Sonia Halliche	Algeria	–	–	–	–	–	–	xo	xxx				3.40	
5	Caroline Cherotich	Kenya	o	o	o	xo	xxx							3.00	NR
6	Winniey Langat	Kenya	o	xo	o	xxx								2.80	
7	Priscilla Nasimiyu	Kenya	xo	xxx										2.40	
