= Badminton at the 2003 All-Africa Games =

- Venue: Indoor Sports Halls National Stadium
- Dates: 4 – 13 October
- Nations: 6

Badminton at the 2003 All-Africa Games was held from October 4 to 13, 2003 in Abuja, Nigeria.

== Medalists ==
Event	Gold	Silver	Bronze
Men's singles	Edicha Ocholi; Nigeria	Ola Fagbemi; Nigeria	Stephan Beeharry; Mauritius
Men's singles	Edicha Ocholi; Nigeria	Ola Fagbemi; Nigeria	Dotun Akinsanya; Nigeria
Women's singles	Grace Daniel; Nigeria	Michelle Edwards; South Africa	Juliette Ah-Wan; Seychelles
Women's singles	Grace Daniel; Nigeria	Michelle Edwards; South Africa	Chantal Botts; South Africa
Men's doubles	Nigeria; Greg Okuonghae; Ibrahim Adamu	Nigeria; Abimbola Odejoke; Dotun Akinsanya	Mauritius; Stephan Beeharry; Édouard Clarisse
Men's doubles	Nigeria; Greg Okuonghae; Ibrahim Adamu	Nigeria; Abimbola Odejoke; Dotun Akinsanya	South Africa; Johan Kleingeld; Chris Dednam
Women's doubles	South Africa; Michelle Edwards; Chantal Botts	Nigeria; Grace Daniel; Susan Ideh	Seychelles; Juliette Ah-Wan; Shirley Etienne
Women's doubles	South Africa; Michelle Edwards; Chantal Botts	Nigeria; Grace Daniel; Susan Ideh	South Africa; Marika Daubern; Antoinette Uys
Mixed doubles	South Africa; Chris Dednam; Antoinette Uys	South Africa; Stewart Carson; Michelle Edwards	Nigeria; Greg Okuonghae; Grace Daniel
Mixed doubles	South Africa; Chris Dednam; Antoinette Uys	South Africa; Stewart Carson; Michelle Edwards	Nigeria; Abimbola Odejoke; Susan Ideh
Mixed team	South Africa; Chantal Botts; Stewart Carson; Marika Daubern; Chris Dednam; Michelle Edwards; Johan Kleingeld; Antoinette Uys	Nigeria; Kuburat Mumuni; Dotun Akinsanya; Prisca Azuine; Grace Daniel; Ola Fagbemi; Susan Ideh; Abimbola Odejoke; Edicha Ocholi; Greg Okuonghae	Seychelles; Georgie Cupidon; Nicholas Jumaye; Steve Malcouzane; Catherina Paulin; Shirley Etienne; Juliette Ah-Wan
Mixed team	South Africa; Chantal Botts; Stewart Carson; Marika Daubern; Chris Dednam; Michelle Edwards; Johan Kleingeld; Antoinette Uys	Nigeria; Kuburat Mumuni; Dotun Akinsanya; Prisca Azuine; Grace Daniel; Ola Fagbemi; Susan Ideh; Abimbola Odejoke; Edicha Ocholi; Greg Okuonghae	Mauritius; Shama Aboobakar; Stephan Beeharry; Édouard Clarisse; Anusha Dajee; Hyder Aboobakar; Amrita Sawaram

== Medal table ==
* Host nation (Nigeria)

Rank	Nation	Gold	Silver	Bronze	Total
1	Nigeria (NGR)*	3	4	3	10
2	South Africa (RSA)	3	2	3	8
3	Mauritius (MRI)	0	0	3	3
3	Seychelles (SEY)	0	0	3	3
Totals (4 entries)		6	6	12	24
