= 2018 African Championships in Athletics – Women's pole vault =

The women's pole vault event at the 2018 African Championships in Athletics was held on 5 August in Asaba, Nigeria.

== Results ==
Rank	Athlete	Nationality	3.60	3.70	3.80	3.90	4.00	4.05	4.10	4.25	Result	Notes
1st place, gold medalist(s)	Dorra Mahfoudhi	Tunisia	–	o	–	o	o	xo	o	xx	4.10	
2nd place, silver medalist(s)	Dina Eltabaa	Egypt									4.05	
3rd place, bronze medalist(s)	Nesrine Brinis	Tunisia	o	o	o	o	xxx				3.90	
4	Fatma Elbendary	Egypt	o	o	o	xxx					3.80	
5	Jodie Sedras	South Africa	o	xo	xxx						3.70	
