= Mauritius at the 2019 African Games =

- Flag of Mauritius
- IOC code: MRI
- NOC: Mauritius Olympic Committee

in Rabat, Morocco 19 August 2019 – 31 August 2019
- Competitors: 91 (62 men and 29 women) in 17 sports
- Medals Ranked 8th: Gold 6 Silver 6 Bronze 12 Total 24

African Games appearances (overview)
- 1987; 1991; 1995; 1999; 2003; 2007; 2011; 2015; 2019; 2023

Mauritius competed at the 2019 African Games held from 19 to 31 August 2019 in Rabat, Morocco. In total, athletes representing the country won six gold medals, six silver medals and twelve bronze medals and the country finished 8th in the medal table.

== Medal summary ==
=== Medal table ===
Medal	Name	Sport	Event	Date
Gold	Kimberley Le Court	Cycling	Women's Mountain bike Cross-country Marathon	23 August
Gold	Roilya Ranaivosoa	Weightlifting	Women's -49 kg Snatch	25 August
Gold	Roilya Ranaivosoa	Weightlifting	Women's -49 kg Clean&Jerk	25 August
Gold	Roilya Ranaivosoa	Weightlifting	Women's -49 kg Total	25 August
Gold	Julien Paul; Aatish Lubah	Badminton	Men's Doubles	29 August
Gold	Merven Clair	Boxing	Men's -69 kg	29 August
Silver	Aurelie Halbwachs	Cycling	Women's Mountain bike Cross-country Olympic	21 August
Silver	Yannick Lincoln	Cycling	Men's Mountain bike Cross-country Marathon	23 August
Silver	Aurelie Halbwachs	Cycling	Women's Mountain bike Cross-country Marathon	23 August
Silver	Aurelie Halbwachs	Cycling	Women's Road race	28 August
Silver	Julien Paul	Badminton	Men's Singles	29 August
Silver	Richarno Colin	Boxing	Men's -63 kg	29 August
Bronze	Rémi Feuillet	Judo	Men's -90 kg	18 August
Bronze	Sébastien Perrine	Judo	Men's +100 kg	18 August
Bronze	Kimberley Le Court	Cycling	Women's Mountain bike Cross-country Olympic	21 August
Bronze	Jonathan Drack	Athletics	Men's Triple Jump	27 August
Bronze	Ketty Lent	Weightlifting	Women's -71 kg Snatch	28 August
Bronze	Ketty Lent	Weightlifting	Women's -71 kg Clean&Jerk	28 August
Bronze	Ketty Lent	Weightlifting	Women's -71 kg Total	28 August
Bronze	Satya Gunput	Fencing	Men's Individual Épée	28 August
Bronze	Aurélie Allet; Julien Paul	Badminton	Mixed Doubles	28 August
Bronze	Alison Sunee	Weightlifting	Women's -76 kg Snatch	28 August
Bronze	Alison Sunee	Weightlifting	Women's -76 kg Clean&Jerk	28 August
Bronze	Alison Sunee	Weightlifting	Women's -76 kg Total	28 August

Medals by sport
Sport	1st place, gold medalist(s)	2nd place, silver medalist(s)	3rd place, bronze medalist(s)	Total
Athletics	0	0	1	1
Badminton	1	1	1	3
Boxing	1	1	0	2
Cycling	1	4	1	6
Fencing	0	0	1	1
Judo	0	0	2	2
Weightlifting	3	0	6	9
Total	6	6	12	24

Medals by date
Day	Date	1st place, gold medalist(s)	2nd place, silver medalist(s)	3rd place, bronze medalist(s)	Total
1	16 August	0	0	0	0
2	17 August	0	0	0	0
3	18 August	0	0	2	2
4	19 August	0	0	0	0
5	20 August	0	0	0	0
6	21 August	0	1	1	2
7	22 August	0	0	0	0
8	23 August	1	2	0	3
9	24 August	0	0	0	0
10	25 August	3	0	0	3
11	26 August	0	0	0	0
12	27 August	0	0	1	1
13	28 August	0	1	8	9
14	29 August	2	2	0	4
15	30 August	0	0	0	0
16	31 August	0	0	0	0
Total		6	6	12	24

Medals by gender
Gender	1st place, gold medalist(s)	2nd place, silver medalist(s)	3rd place, bronze medalist(s)	Total
Male	2	3	4	9
Female	4	3	7	14
Mixed	0	0	1	1
Total	6	6	12	24

== Archery ==
Jean Marie Cliff Babet, Ryan Chan Yam and Stephan Klein represented Mauritius in archery in the men's individual recurve and men's team recurve events.

== Athletics ==
Jonathan Drack won the bronze medal in the men's triple jump event, the only medal won by athletes representing Mauritius in athletics.

Jonathan Bardottier and Noah Bibi represented Mauritius in the men's 100 metres event. Bardottier advanced to compete in the semifinals and Bibi did not advance to compete in the semifinals.

Bardottier also competed in the men's 200 metres event. In this event he also advanced to compete in the semifinals but he did not qualify to compete in the final.

== Badminton ==
Mauritius entered six players (3 men's and 3 women's) at the Games.

In total, badminton players representing Mauritius won one gold medal, one silver medal and one bronze medal.

Julien Paul and Aatish Lubah won the gold medal in the men's doubles event.

Julien Paul won the silver medal in the men's singles event.

Julien Paul and Aurélie Allet won the bronze medal in the mixed doubles event.

== Boxing ==
Mauritius competed in boxing. Boxers representing Mauritius won one gold medal and one silver medal and the country finished in 6th place in the boxing medal table.

== Chess ==
Marie Patrick Claude Emmanuel, Naipai Hoolan, Aamirah Beekhy Bibi and Uvika Essoo represented Mauritius in chess.

== Cycling ==
Mauritius competed in mountain bike cycling.

== Fencing ==
Satya Gunput, the only athlete to represent Mauritius in fencing, won the bronze medal in the Men's Individual Épée event.

== Judo ==
Nine athletes represented Mauritius in judo: Hansley Jeffrey Patrice Adonis, Louis Daniel Begue, Noemie Evenor, Rémi Feuillet, Kimberley Jean Pierre, Joseph Sebastien Perrine, Daniellito Rosidor-Perrine, Marie Chrystina Speville and Marie Sarah Samuelle Sylva.

Rémi Feuillet won a bronze medal in the men's −90 kg event.

Sébastien Perrine won a bronze medal in the men's +100 kg event.

== Karate ==
Hans Ramdharrysing, Kushal Mohabeer, Abishek Aman Kavi Ramluchumun, Roddy Shane Wong Fat Lai Kin and Jean Paul Baniatti Jean Louis represented Mauritius in karate.

== Swimming ==
Gregory Anodin, Jonathan Chung Yee, Ruth Tessa Chun Kiaw Ip Hen Cheung, Camille Koenig and Mathieu Marquet competed in swimming.

== Table tennis ==
Mauritius competed in table tennis.

== Taekwondo ==
One athlete represented Mauritius in Taekwondo.

Athlete	Event	Round of 32	Round of 16	Quarterfinals	Semifinals	Final	
Athlete	Event	Opposition Result	Opposition Result	Opposition Result	Opposition Result	Opposition Result	Rank
Diesson Brian Joseph	Men's –80 kg	—N/a	Soumare (SEN); L 3–28	Did not advance			

== Triathlon ==
Timothee Guy Hugnin and Jean Gael Laurent L'Entete competed in the men's triathlon event and finished in 4th and 12th place respectively.

Lisa-marie Chloe Laetitia D'Autriche competed in the women's triathlon event. She finished in 9th place with a time of 1:18:57.

== Volleyball ==
Both the men's team and women's team were scheduled to compete.

== Weightlifting ==
Weightlifters representing Mauritius won three gold medals and six bronze medals and the country finished in 5th place in the weightlifting medal table.

== Wrestling ==
Four athletes represented Mauritius in wrestling.

Key:

- VT – Victory by fall.
- PP – Decision by points – the loser with technical points.
- PO – Decision by points – the loser without technical points.
- ST – Great superiority – the loser without technical points and a margin of victory of at least 8 (Greco-Roman) or 10 (freestyle) points.
- SP – Technical superiority – the loser with technical points and a margin of victory of at least 8 (Greco-Roman) or 10 (freestyle) points.
- IN - Victory by injury - the loser is injured before or during a bout.

Men's freestyle

Athlete	Event	Qualification	Quarterfinal	Semifinal	Repechage 1	Final / BM	
Athlete	Event	Opposition Result	Opposition Result	Opposition Result	Opposition Result	Opposition Result	Rank
Rosario Meunier	−57 kg	C Ansari (MAR); L 2–12 ^{SP}	Did not advance				10
Jean Bandou	−65 kg	M Mahabila (KEN); W 15–10 ^{PP}	M Cumba (GBS); L 0–2 ^{VT}	Did not advance	C Ndri (CIV); L 10–4 ^{VT}	Did not advance	7
Jean Frederic Marianne	−74 kg	R Regani (MAR); L 0–10 ^{ST}	Did not advance				14

Women's freestyle

Athlete	Event	Qualification	Quarterfinal	Semifinal	Repechage 1	Final / BM	
Athlete	Event	Opposition Result	Opposition Result	Opposition Result	Opposition Result	Opposition Result	Rank
Katouskia Pariadhaven	−68 kg	Bye	B Ngiri (CMR); L 0–10 ^{VT}	Did not advance			9

== See also ==
- Mauritius at the African Games
