= Mauritius at the 2003 All-Africa Games =

- IOC code: MRI
- NOC: Mauritius Olympic Committee

in Abuja 5 October 2003 – 17 October 2003
- Medals: Gold 0 Silver 0 Bronze 3 Total 3

All-Africa Games appearances (overview)
- 1987; 1991; 1995; 1999; 2003; 2007; 2011; 2015; 2019; 2023

Mauritius competed in the 2003 All-Africa Games held at the National Stadium in the city of Abuja, Nigeria. The country competed in sixteen events and won three bronze medals, all in badminton.

== Competitors ==
Mauritius competed in sixteen events, ten for men and six for women.

== Medal summary ==
The team won three bronze medals and were ranked joint thirty-first in the medal table alongside Burkina Faso, Niger and Togo.

=== Medal table ===
Sport	Gold	Silver	Bronze	Total
Badminton	0	0	3	3
Total	0	0	3	3

== List of Medalists ==
=== Bronze Medal ===
Medal	Name	Sport	Event	Date	Ref
Bronze	Stephan Beeharry	Badminton	Men's singles		
Bronze	Stephan Beeharry and Édouard Clarisse	Badminton	Men's doubles		
Bronze	Shama Aboobakar; Stephan Beeharry; Édouard Clarisse; Anusha Dajee; Hyder Aboobakar; Amrita Sawaram	Badminton	Teams		

== See also ==
- Mauritius at the African Games
