= 2016 African Championships in Athletics – Women's discus throw =

The women's discus throw event at the 2016 African Championships in Athletics was held on 24 June in Kings Park Stadium.

== Results ==
| Rank | Athlete | Nationality | Result | Notes |
|---|---|---|---|---|
| 1st place, gold medalist(s) | Nwanneka Okwelogu | Nigeria | 56.75 | |
| 2nd place, silver medalist(s) | Chinwe Okoro | Nigeria | 55.67 | |
| 3rd place, bronze medalist(s) | Chioma Onyekwere | Nigeria | 53.91 | |
| 4 | Julia Agawu | Ghana | 53.91 | |
| 5 | Ischke Senekal | South Africa | 50.16 | |
| 6 | Leandri Geel | South Africa | 47.93 | |
| 7 | Auriol Dongmo | Cameroon | 47.00 | |
| 8 | Amina El Mouaddine | Morocco | 46.85 | |
| 9 | Jessica Inchude | Guinea-Bissau | 44.30 | |
| 10 | Salome Mugabe | Mozambique | 42.43 | |
