= Athletics at the 2015 African Games – Women's discus throw =

The women's discus throw event at the 2015 African Games was held on 16 September.

== Results ==
Rank	Name	Nationality	#1	#2	#3	#4	#5	#6	Result	Notes
1st place, gold medalist(s)	Claire Uke	Nigeria	51.09	x	54.25	x	x	x	54.25	
2nd place, silver medalist(s)	Ischke Senekal	South Africa	44.95	48.43	50.53	48.90	x	48.94	50.53	
3rd place, bronze medalist(s)	Julia Agawu	Ghana	46.68	49.08	x	x	43.84	45.33	49.08	
4	Precious Ogunleye	Nigeria	x	x	40.60	x	46.03	48.18	48.18	
5	Auriol Dongmo Mekemnang	Cameroon	43.27	45.14	x	x	–	–	45.14	
6	Sarah Hasseib	Egypt	43.14	x	x	44.76	43.39	x	44.76	
7	Sonia Smuts	South Africa	40.82	39.98	42.35	42.74	40.19	44.51	44.51	
8	Fadja El-Kasaby	Egypt	43.04	43.70	42.70	x	41.62	41.41	43.70	
9	Fanny Wigile Ossala	Congo	38.83	38.72	36.81				38.83	NR
10	Almaz Niguse	Ethiopia	37.08	x	35.31				37.08	
	Rebecca Famurewa	Nigeria							DNS	
	Joselin Nyangono Okono	Cameroon							DNS	
