= Mauritius at the African Games =

- IOC code: MRI
- NOC: Mauritius Olympic Committee
- Medals: Gold 30 Silver 35 Bronze 65 Total 130

African Games appearances (overview)
- 1987; 1991; 1995; 1999; 2003; 2007; 2011; 2015; 2019; 2023

== Medal count ==
Year	Host city	Gold	Silver	Bronze	Total
1987	Nairobi	1	0	2	3
1991	Cairo	1	5	6	12
1995	Harare	3	6	9	18
1999	Johannesburg	1	7	9	17
2003	Abuja	0	0	3	3
2007	Algiers	0	1	2	3
2011	Maputo	4	2	7	13
2015	Brazzaville	5	3	4	12
2019	Rabat	6	6	12	24
2023	Rabat	9	5	11	25
Total		30	35	65	130
