= Athletics at the 2015 African Games – Women's shot put =

The women's shot put event at the 2015 African Games was held on 17 September.

== Results ==
Rank	Name	Nationality	#1	#2	#3	#4	#5	#6	Result	Notes
1st place, gold medalist(s)	Auriol Dongmo Mekemnang	Cameroon	17.21	15.84	x	x	16.13	17.10	17.21	NR
2nd place, silver medalist(s)	Claire Uke	Nigeria	16.64	x	16.31	16.36	15.45	x	16.64	
3rd place, bronze medalist(s)	Sonia Smuts	South Africa	14.55	15.92	15.16	15.19	15.10	14.66	15.92	
4	Salome Mugabe	Mozambique	x	x	13.56	11.69	13.74	13.46	13.74	
5	Ischke Senekal	South Africa	x	12.87	x	x	13.64	x	13.64	
6	Fadja El-Kasaby	Egypt	x	12.95	x	x	x	12.53	12.95	
7	Amele Yibeltal	Ethiopia	11.00	11.90	12.29	12.64	11.91	11.73	12.64	NR
8	Rebecca Kerubo	Kenya	8.87	9.65	9.77	10.26	x	9.51	10.26	
	Fanny Wigile Ossala	Congo							DNS	
	Precious Ogunleye	Nigeria							DNS	
