= 2004 African Championships in Athletics – Women's pole vault =

The women's pole vault event at the 2004 African Championships in Athletics was held in Brazzaville, Republic of the Congo on July 15.

== Results ==
Rank	Name	Nationality	Result	Notes
1st place, gold medalist(s)	Syrine Balti	Tunisia	4.00	
2nd place, silver medalist(s)	Samantha Dodd	South Africa	3.80	
3rd place, bronze medalist(s)	Nancy Cheekoussen	Mauritius	3.70	
4	Nisrine Dinar	Morocco	3.50	
5	Carine Golom Mbeh	Republic of the Congo	2.40	NR
