= Miré Reinstorf =

South African pole vaulter (born 2002)

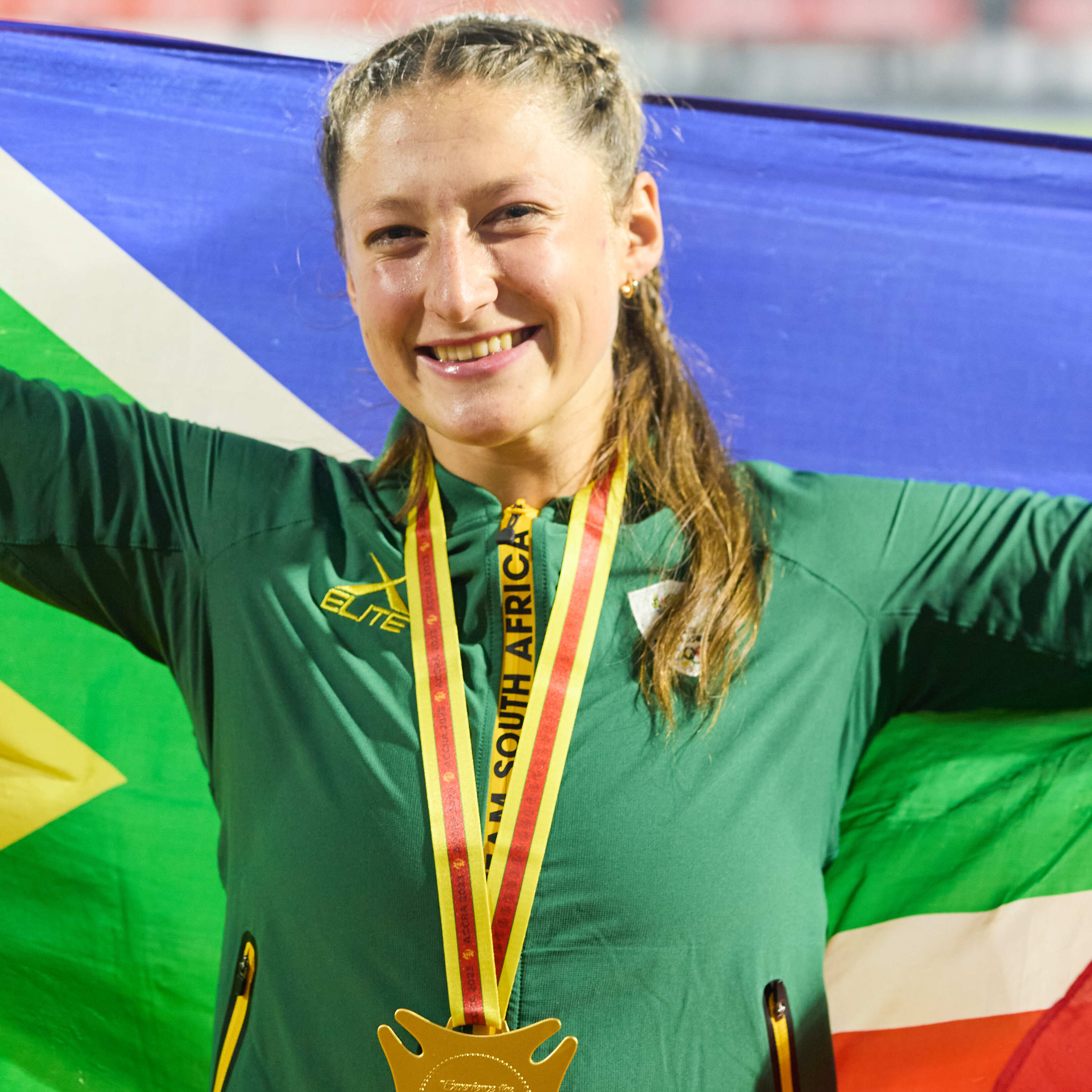
- Reinstorf at the 2023 African Games

Personal information
- National team: South Africa
- Born: 5 June 2002 (age 24) George, South Africa

Sport
- Country: South Africa
- Sport: Athletics
- Event: Pole vault

Achievements and titles
- Personal bests: Outdoor: 4.35 m (2024) GR
Medal record
Women's athletics
Representing South Africa
African Games
Gold medal – first place	2023 Accra	Pole vault
African Championships
Gold medal – first place	2022 Mauritius	Pole vault
Gold medal – first place	2024 Douala	Pole vault
World U20 Championships
Gold medal – first place	2021 Nairobi	Pole vault

Miré Reinstorf (born 5 June 2002) is a South African track and field athlete who specializes in the pole vault. She was the gold medallist at the World Athletics U20 Championships in 2021.

== International competitions ==
All information taken from World Athletics profile.

Year	Competition	Venue	Position	Notes
Representing South Africa
2021	World U20 Championships	Nairobi, Kenya	1st	4.15 m
2022	African Championships	Port Louis, Mauritius	1st	3.80 m
2023	World Championships	Budapest, Hungary	–	NM
2024	African Games	Accra, Ghana	1st	4.35 m GR
2024	African Championships	Douala, Cameroon	1st	4.10 m
2025	World University Games	Bochum, Germany	20th (q)	3.70 m
2025	World Championships	Tokyo, Japan	–	NM

=== National titles ===
- South African Athletics Championships
  - Pole vault: 2019, 2021, 2022
- USSA Championships
  - Pole vault: 2021, 2022
- South African U20 Championships
  - Pole vault: 2021
- South African U18 Championships
  - Pole vault: 2019
