= Stewart Carson =

South African badminton player (born 1976)

Personal information
- Born: Stewart James Carson; 12 June 1976 (age 50) Irvine, North Ayrshire, Scotland
- Height: 1.93 m (6 ft 4 in)
- Weight: 84 kg (185 lb)

Sport
- Country: South Africa
- Sport: Badminton
- BWF profile
Medal record
Men's badminton
Representing South Africa
All-Africa Games
Gold medal – first place	2003 Abuja	Mixed team
Silver medal – second place	2003 Abuja	Mixed doubles
African Championships
Gold medal – first place	2004 Rose Hill	Mixed team
Gold medal – first place	2002 Casablanca	Mixed team
Bronze medal – third place	2004 Rose Hill	Men's doubles

Stewart Carson (born 12 June 1976) is a retired badminton player from South Africa. He was part of the national team that won the gold medal at the 2002 and 2004 African Championships, also at the 2003 All-Africa Games. Carson competed in badminton at the 2004 Summer Olympics in men's doubles with partner Dorian James. They were defeated in the round of 32 by Howard Bach and Kevin Han of the United States. He is currently the National Badminton Coach of South Africa.

== Achievements ==
=== All-Africa Games ===
Mixed doubles
Year	Venue	Partner	Opponent	Score	Result
2003	Indoor Sports Halls National Stadium; Abuja, Nigeria	(South Africa) Michelle Edwards	(South Africa) Chris Dednam (South Africa) Antoinette Uys		Silver

=== African Championships ===
Men's doubles
Year	Venue	Partner	Opponent	Score	Result
2004	National Badminton Centre; Rose Hill, Mauritius	(South Africa) Dorian James	(Nigeria) Dotun Akinsanya (Nigeria) Abimbola Odejoke	7–15, 15–10, 5–15	Bronze

=== IBF International ===
Men's singles
Year	Tournament	Opponent	Score	Result
2002	South Africa International	(Wales) Richard Vaughan	1–7, 0–7, 0–7	(silver) Runner-up

Men's doubles
Year	Tournament	Partner	Opponent	Score	Result
2002	South Africa International	(South Africa) Dorian James	(South Africa) Chris Dednam (South Africa) Johan Kleingeld	7–5, 0–7, 5–7, –	(silver) Runner-up

Mixed doubles
Year	Tournament	Partner	Opponent	Score	Result
1999	South Africa International	(South Africa) Antoinette Uys	(South Africa) Johan Kleingeld (South Africa) Karen Coetzer	7–15, 8–15	(silver) Runner-up
