= 2022 African Championships in Athletics – Women's shot put =

Women's shot put event

The women's shot put event at the 2022 African Championships in Athletics was held on 8 June in Port Louis, Mauritius.

== Results ==
Rank	Athlete	Nationality	#1	#2	#3	#4	#5	#6	Result	Notes
1st place, gold medalist(s)	Ischke Senekal	South Africa	x	x	12.88	15.95	16.40	x	16.40	
2nd place, silver medalist(s)	Carine Mékam	Gabon	14.87	15.57	15.75	15.23	15.02	15.87	15.87	
3rd place, bronze medalist(s)	Zonica Lindeque	South Africa	14.51	14.74	15.31	14.30	15.79	15.00	15.79	
4	Odile Ahouanwanou	Benin	14.93	–	–	14.63	14.65	–	14.93	
5	Dane Roets	South Africa	14.57	13.71	14.56	14.87	14.59	x	14.87	
6	Tuane Silver	Namibia	13.52	13.62	13.76	13.78	13.70	13.43	13.78	
7	Rosie Mulambavu	Democratic Republic of the Congo	x	9.77	9.49	6.69	9.69	10.25	10.25	
