= 2006 African Championships in Athletics – Women's pole vault =

The women's pole vault event at the 2006 African Championships in Athletics was held at the Stade Germain Comarmond on August 10.

== Results ==
Rank	Name	Nationality	3.00	3.20	3.40	3.50	3.60	3.70	3.80	4.00	4.21	4.30	Result	Notes
1st place, gold medalist(s)	Syrine Balti	Tunisia	–	–	–	–	–	–	o	o	o	xxx	4.21	PB
2nd place, silver medalist(s)	Nisrine Dinar	Morocco	–	–	–	–	o	–	xxx				3.60	
2nd place, silver medalist(s)	Lindi Roux	South Africa	–	–	–	–	o	–	xxx				3.60	
4	Nesrin Emam	Egypt	–	–	o	xxo	xo	xxx					3.60	
5	Vanisha Nemdharry	Mauritius	o	xo	xxx								3.20	
5	Laetitia Berthier	Burundi	–	xo	xxx								3.20	
	Nancy Cheekoussen	Mauritius	–	xxx									NM	
	Samantha Dodd	South Africa											DNS	
