= Nwanneka Okwelogu =

Nigerian athlete

Medal record

Women's athletics

Representing Nigeria

African Championships
Gold medal – first place	2016 Durban	Discus throw
Silver medal – second place	2016 Durban	Shot put
Silver medal – second place	2014 Marrakesh	Discus throw

Nwanneka Mariauchenna "Nikki" Okwelogu (born 5 May 1995) is a Nigerian track and field athlete who competes in the shot put and discus throw events. She was the 2016 discus gold medalist at the African Championships in Athletics. Born in the United States, she set Ivy League records in the throws while at Harvard University.

== Career ==
Born in Fresno, California to Nigerian parents, Nikki attended Clovis West High School where she competed in both shot put and discus. She went on to attend Harvard University from 2013 and competed for their Harvard Crimson track team. In her first year there she broke the Ivy League record in the discus with a throw of 53.31 m (174 ft 10 3/4 in) and set a school record in the shot put at 16.05 m (52 ft 7 3/4 in). Her sister Nonny also became an Ivy League thrower, attending Princeton.

The 2014 season saw her first national success with a shot put win at the Nigerian Athletics Championships. She made her international debut that year. At the 2014 World Junior Championships in Athletics she competed in both the shot and discus and was a shot put finalist. Her first medal followed shortly after at the 2014 African Championships in Athletics, where she was narrowly fourth in the shot put but comfortably took the discus silver medal behind Chinwe Okoro. At nineteen years old, she was the youngest entrant in those competitions. She also competed at the 2014 Commonwealth Games that summer, ending in ninth.

She improved her bests in the 2015 season, adding more than a meter to her shot put with a throw of 17.32 m (56 ft 9 3/4 in) and having a discus best of 53.31 m (174 ft 10 3/4 in). Her shot put best was an Ivy League record. She placed sixth at the 2015 NCAA Division I Indoor Track and Field Championships. The following year she reached her first collegiate podium with third place in the shot put at the 2016 NCAA Indoor Championships. She also was an NCAA Outdoor finalist, taking eighth.

Okwelogu established herself among Africa's best throwers at the 2016 African Championships in Athletics by taking the discus gold medal in a personal record of 56.75 m (186 ft 2 1/4 in), which helped Nigeria to a sweep of the medals alongside 2014 champion Okoro and Chioma Onyekwere. She also claimed the shot put silver medal behind Cameroon's Auriol Dongmo.

== International competitions ==
Year	Competition	Venue	Position	Event	Notes
2014	World Junior Championships	Eugene, United States	11th	Shot put	14.77 m
2014	World Junior Championships	Eugene, United States	6th (q)	Discus throw	49.07 m
2014	Commonwealth Games	New Delhi, India	9th	Shot put	15.13 m
2014	African Championships	Marrakesh, Morocco	4th	Shot put	15.14 m
2014	African Championships	Marrakesh, Morocco	2nd	Discus throw	51.66 m
2016	African Championships	Durban, South Africa	2nd	Shot put	17.07 m
2016	African Championships	Durban, South Africa	1st	Discus throw	56.75 m
2016	Olympic Games	Rio de Janeiro, Brazil	29th (q)	Shot put	16.67 m

== National titles ==
- Nigerian Athletics Championships
  - Shot put: 2014
