= 2008 African Championships in Athletics – Women's pole vault =

The women's pole vault event at the 2008 African Championships in Athletics was held at the Addis Ababa Stadium on May 1.

== Results ==
Rank	Athlete	Nationality	3.40	3.50	3.60	3.70	3.80	3.90	4.00	4.22	Result	Notes
1st place, gold medalist(s)	Leila Ben Youssef	Tunisia	–	–	o	o	o	o	xo	xxx	4.00	
2nd place, silver medalist(s)	Nisrine Dinar	Morocco	xo	–	xo	o	xxo	x–	xx		3.80	
3rd place, bronze medalist(s)	Laetitia Berthier	Burundi	o	o	o	o	xxx				3.70	
4	Deone Joubert	South Africa	o	o	xo	xxx					3.60	
5	Lindi Roux	South Africa	xxo	o	xo	xx–	x				3.60	
6	Eva Thornton	South Africa	xxo	o	xxx						3.50	
