= Julia Agawu =

Ghanaian discus thrower

Julia Agawu (born 20 April 1991) is a Ghanaian discus thrower.

She finished fourth at the 2014 African Championships, won the bronze medal at the 2015 African Games and finished fourth again at the 2016 African Championships. She also competed at the 2014 Commonwealth Games without reaching the final; and in the shot put event she finished seventh at the 2014 African Championships.

Her personal best throw is 54.59 metres, achieved in May 2013 in Miramar. She has 14.91 metres in the shot put, achieved in April 2013 in Knoxville.
