= 2022 African Championships in Athletics – Women's pole vault =

The women's pole vault event at the 2022 African Championships in Athletics was held on 10 June in Port Louis, Mauritius.

== Results ==
Rank	Athlete	Nationality	3.30	3.40	3.50	3.60	3.70	3.80	4.00	Result	Notes
1st place, gold medalist(s)	Mirè Reinstorf	South Africa	–	–	–	–	–	o	xxx	3.80	
2nd place, silver medalist(s)	Dorra Mahfoudhi	Tunisia	–	o	o	o	o	xxx		3.70	
3rd place, bronze medalist(s)	Nicole Janse van Rensburg	South Africa	–	–	o	xo	o	xxx		3.70	
4	Erica Moolman	South Africa	–	–	o	xo	xo	xxx		3.70	
5	Julia Boslak	Réunion	xo	–	xo	xo	xxo	xxx		3.70	
6	Dina Eltabaa	Egypt	xxo	o	xo	o	xxx			3.60	
