= 2002 African Championships in Athletics – Women's pole vault =

The women's pole vault event at the 2002 African Championships in Athletics was held in Radès, Tunisia on August 7.

== Results ==
| Rank | Name | Nationality | Result | Notes |
|---|---|---|---|---|
| 1st place, gold medalist(s) | Syrine Balti | Tunisia | 4.06 | |
| 2nd place, silver medalist(s) | Aida Mohsni | Tunisia | 3.60 | |
| 3rd place, bronze medalist(s) | Asma Akkari | Tunisia | 3.40 | |
| 4 | Nancy Cheekoussen | Mauritius | 3.30 | |
| 5 | Sonya Smila | Algeria | 3.20 | |
| 6 | Amina Chahreddine | Algeria | 2.80 | |
