= Athletics at the 2015 African Games – Women's pole vault =

The women's pole vault event at the 2015 African Games was held on 14 September.

== Results ==
Rank	Name	Nationality	3.00	3.20	3.40	3.50	3.60	3.70	3.90	4.00	4.10	4.20	Result	Notes
1st place, gold medalist(s)	Syrine Balti	Tunisia	–	–	–	–	–	o	o	o	o	xxx	4.10	GR
2nd place, silver medalist(s)	Dorra Mahfoudhi	Tunisia	–	–	–	o	–	o	o	xo	xxo	xxx	4.10	GR
3rd place, bronze medalist(s)	Sinaly Ouattara	Ivory Coast	o	o	xo	–	xxx						3.40	
	Winnie Chebet	Kenya											DNS	
