= Alima Ouattara =

Ivorian pole vaulter

Personal information
- Full name: Sinali Alima Outtara
- Born: 2 January 1988 (age 38) Ivory Coast

Sport
- Sport: Athletics
Medal record
Women's athletics
Representing Ivory Coast
African Championships
Bronze medal – third place	2010 Nairobi	Pole vault
All-Africa Games
Silver medal – second place	2011 Maputo	Pole vault
Bronze medal – third place	2015 Brazzaville	Pole vault

Sinali Alima Outtara (born 1 February 1988) is an Ivorian pole vaulter, who is the national record holder in indoor and outdoor pole vault events. She won a bronze medal at the 2010 African Championships in Athletics, a silver medal at the 2011 All-Africa Games, and a bronze medal at the 2015 African Games.

== Personal life ==
As of 2011, Ouattara lived in Paris, France.

== Career ==
In 2008, Ouattra came joint sixth in the junior pole vault event at the French national championships. In 2010, she came third in the pole vault event at the 2010 African Championships in Athletics, after clearing a height of 3.40 metres. She came second in the pole vault event at the 2011 All-Africa Games. Ouattra cleared a height of 3.20 metres, and was one of only two people with a successful attempt in the event. She was the country's first medallist at the Games. In the same year, Ouattara set an Ivorian national record for indoor pole vault, by clearing a height of 3.65 metres at an event in Aulnay-sous-Bois, France.

In 2014, Ouattra set an outdoor national record of 3.80 metres at an event in Aulnay-sous-Bois, France. She came third at the 2015 African Games, clearing a height of 3.40 metres. In 2016, Ouattra came fourth in the pole vault event at the 2016 African Championships in Athletics. Ouattra competed at the 2017 Jeux de la Francophonie; she was one of eight Ivorian women at the Games.
