= Ansume de Beer =

South African pole vaulter (born 2007)

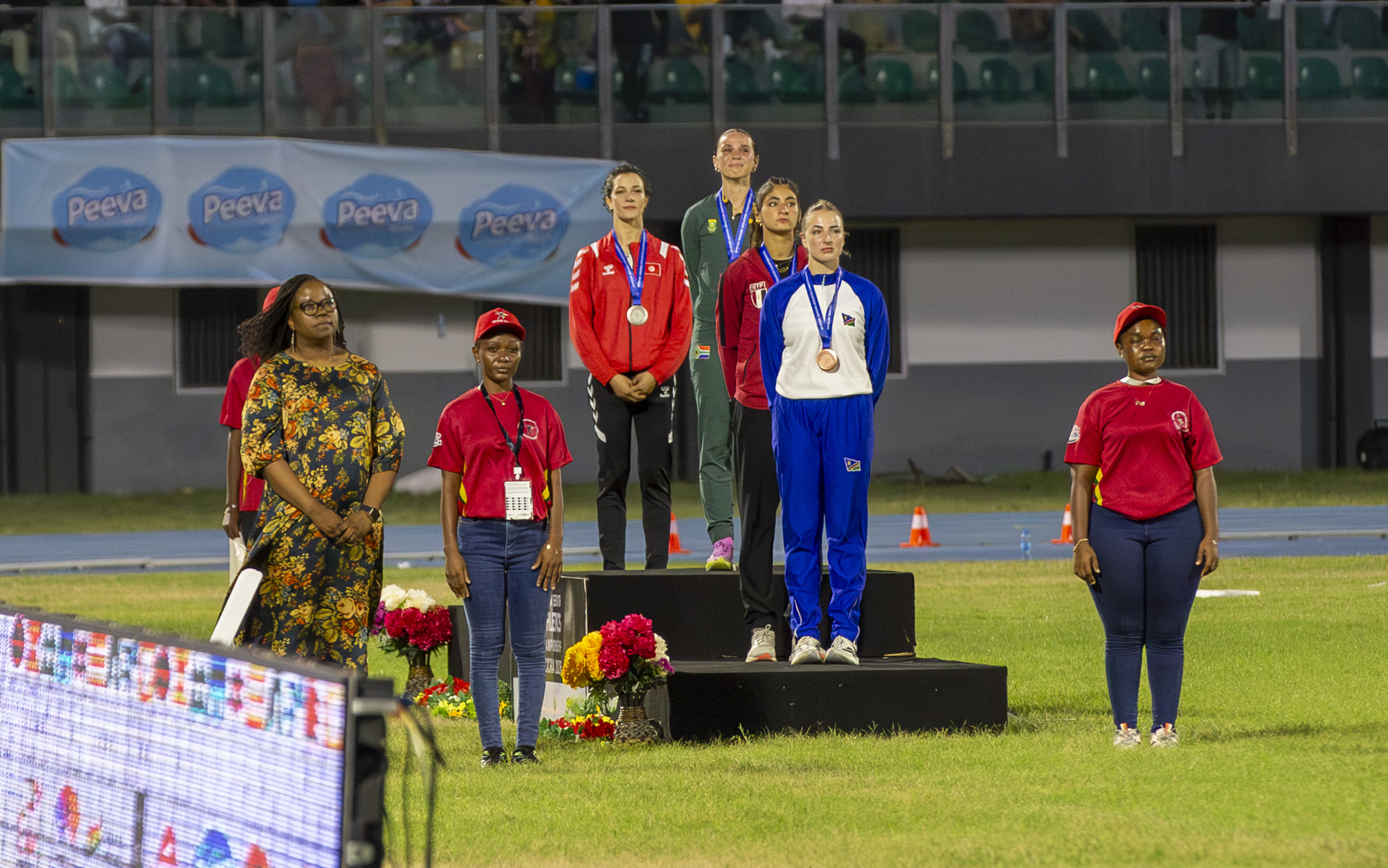
- At the 2026 African Championships

Personal information
- Born: 7 August 2007 (age 18)

Sport
- Sport: Athletics
- Event: Pole vault

Achievements and titles
- Personal bests: Pole vault: 4.50m (2026) AU20R
Medal record
Women's athletics
Representing South Africa
African Championships
Gold medal – first place	2026 Accra	Pole vault
African U20 Championships
Gold medal – first place	2025 Abeokuta	Pole vault

Ansume de Beer (born 7 August 2007) is a South African pole vaulter. She won the gold medal at the 2026 African Championships.

== Biography ==
A member of Boland Athletics, De Beer set a new African age-group record of 4.16m metres while competing in Stellenbosch in 2025. That year, she won the senior South African Athletics Championships for the first time with a clearance of 4.10 metres. She also won the gold medal at the 2025 African U20 Championships in Abeokuta, Nigeria in July 2025.

The following year, while competing at the South African U20 Championships in March 2026, de Beer cleared 4.18m to add two centimetres to set a new South African national U20 record. In April, she won the senior title at the 2026 South African Athletics Championships in Stellenbosch, clearing 4.20 metres.

The following month, she won the gold medal at the 2026 African Championships in Accra, Ghana, with an African U20 record clearance of 4.30 metres.
