= 2021 World Athletics U20 Championships – Women's pole vault =

Women's pole vault at the 2021 World Athletics U20 Championships
- Venue: Kasarani Stadium
- Dates: 18 August
- Competitors: 9 from 7 nations
- Winning height: 4.15 m

Medalists
gold medal	Mirè Reinstorf	South Africa
silver medal	Elise Russis	France
bronze medal	Heather Abadie	Canada

The women's pole vault at the 2021 World Athletics U20 Championships was held at the Kasarani Stadium on 18 August.

== Records ==
Standing records prior to the 2021 World Athletics U20 Championships
World U20 Record	Wilma Murto (FIN)	4.71	Zweibrücken, Germany	31 January 2016
Championship Record	Angelica Moser (SUI)	4.55	Bydgoszcz, Poland	21 July 2016
World U20 Leading	Paige Sommers (USA)	4.49	Westlake Village, United States	26 May 2021

== Results ==
=== Final ===
The final was held on 18 August at 16:00.

Rank	Name	Nationality	3.80	3.95	4.05	4.15	4.20	Mark	Notes
1st place, gold medalist(s)	Mirè Reinstorf	South Africa	xo	o	o	o	xxx	4.15	AU20R
2nd place, silver medalist(s)	Elise Russis	France	–	o	xxo	xo	xxx	4.15	
3rd place, bronze medalist(s)	Heather Abadie	Canada	o	o	o	xxx		4.05	
4	Anastasia Resta	Greece	xo	o	o	xxx		4.05	
5	Petra Garamvölgyi	Hungary	xo	o	xo	xxx		4.05	
6	Luciana Gómez	Argentina	xxo	o	xxx			3.95	
7	Emma Brentel	France	–	xo	xxx			3.95	
8	Niki Joannidu	Czech Republic	xxo	xxx				3.80	
	Iliana Triantafyllou	Greece	xxx					NM	
