= Athletics at the 2019 African Games – Women's pole vault =

The women's pole vault event at the 2019 African Games was held on 27 August in Rabat.

== Results ==
Rank	Name	Nationality	3.20	3.65	3.75	3.80	3.85	3.90	3.95	4.00	4.05	4.10	4.15	4.25	4.31	4.35	Result	Notes
1st place, gold medalist(s)	Dora Mahfoudhi	Tunisia	–	–	xo	–	o	–	o	–	o	o	xo	o	xxo	xr	4.31	GR, NR
2nd place, silver medalist(s)	Fatma Elbendary	Egypt	–	o	o	o	–	o	o	o	xo	o	xxx				4.10	
3rd place, bronze medalist(s)	Donia Ahmed El Tabagh	Egypt	–	o	o	–	o	–	xo	o	xxx						4.00	
4	Nour Aly	Egypt	–	xxo	o	o	o	xo	xo	xxx							3.95	
	Nesrine Brinis	Tunisia	xxx														NM	
