= Athletics at the 2019 African Games – Women's discus throw =

The women's discus throw event at the 2019 African Games was held on 26 August in Rabat.

== Results ==
Rank	Name	Nationality	#1	#2	#3	#4	#5	#6	Result	Notes
1st place, gold medalist(s)	Chioma Onyekwere	Nigeria	54.56	55.06	x	x	59.91	53.24	59.91	GR
2nd place, silver medalist(s)	Yolandi Stander	South Africa	53.65	57.75	55.99	54.37	55.81	x	57.75	
3rd place, bronze medalist(s)	Ischke Senekal	South Africa	51.74	52.02	51.73	50.18	x	53.95	53.95	
4	Ashley Anumba	Nigeria	53.31	x	50.15	53.29	x	53.45	53.45	
5	Princess Kara	Nigeria	49.42	47.67	48.11	47.30	48.93	49.85	49.85	
6	Roselyn Rakamba	Kenya	46.81	x	x	x	45.62	48.40	48.40	
7	Amira Sayed	Egypt	42.92	47.13	47.02	45.11	46.77	45.36	47.13	
8	Dhouibi Rawand	Tunisia	40.79	43.03	37.58	42.72	43.81	42.61	43.81	
9	Merhawit Tshaye	Ethiopia	41.34	x	41.55				41.55	
	Emilie Dia	Mali	x	x	x				NM	
	Zurga Usman	Ethiopia							DNS	
