= Dorra Mahfoudhi =

Tunisian pole vaulter (born 1993)

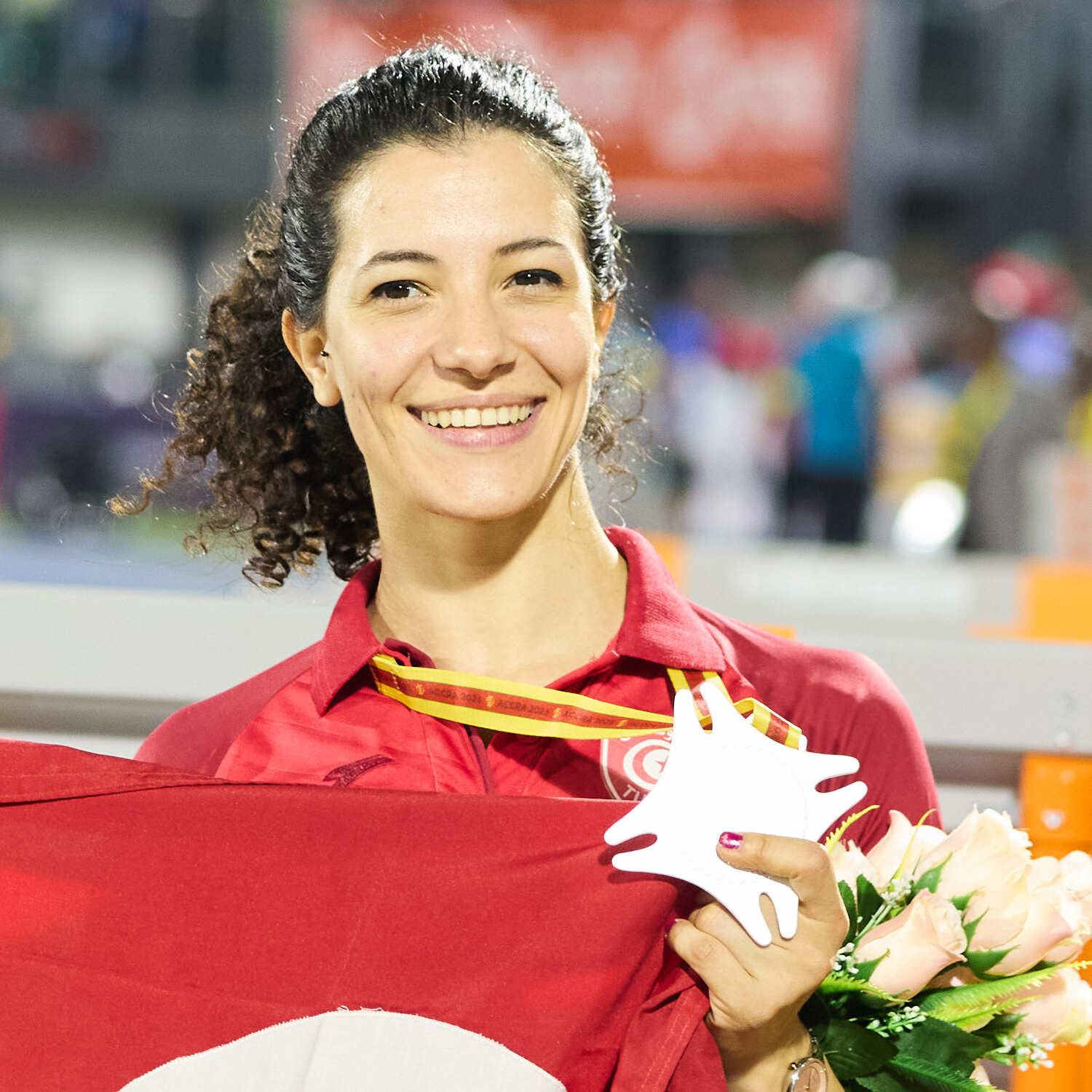
- Mahfoudhi at the 2023 African Games

Personal information
- Nationality: Tunisia
- Born: 7 August 1993 (age 32)
- Height: 1.72 m (5 ft 8 in)
- Weight: 56 kg (123 lb)

Sport
- Sport: Athletics
- Event: Pole Vault
Medal record
Women's Athletics
Representing Tunisia
African Games
Gold medal – first place	2011 Maputo	Pole vault
Gold medal – first place	2019 Rabat	Pole vault
Silver medal – second place	2015 Brazzaville	Pole vault
Silver medal – second place	2023 Accra	Pole vault
African Championships
Gold medal – first place	2018 Asaba	Pole vault
Silver medal – second place	2016 Durban	Pole vault
Silver medal – second place	2022 Saint Pierre	Pole vault
Silver medal – second place	2024 Douala	Pole vault
Silver medal – second place	2026 Accra	Pole vault
Bronze medal – third place	2012 Porto-Novo	Pole vault
Bronze medal – third place	2014 Marrakesh	Pole vault
- Updated on 26 August 2016

Dorra Mahfoudhi (born 7 August 1993) is a Tunisian athlete specialising in the pole vault. She won several medals on continental level. Dorra is also a physician specialised in surgery.

Her personal best in the event are 4.31 metres outdoors (Rabat 2019) and 3.40 metres indoors (Bordeaux 2011).

== Competition record ==
Year	Competition	Venue	Position	Event	Notes
Representing Tunisia
2010	Youth Olympic Games	Singapore	5th (B)	Pole vault	3.45 m
2011	African Junior Championships	Gaborone, Botswana	1st	Pole vault	3.40 m
2011	All-Africa Games	Maputo, Mozambique	1st	Pole vault	3.60 m
2011	Pan Arab Games	Doha, Qatar	2nd	Pole vault	3.65 m
2012	Arab Junior Championships	Amman, Jordan	1st	Pole vault	3.55 m
2012	African Championships	Porto-Novo, Benin	3rd	Pole vault	3.40 m
2013	Arab Championships	Doha, Qatar	3rd	Pole vault	3.60 m
2013	Islamic Solidarity Games	Palembang, Indonesia	4th	Pole vault	3.65 m
2013	Islamic Solidarity Games	Palembang, Indonesia	5th	Long jump	4.88 m
2014	African Championships	Marrakesh, Morocco	3rd	Pole vault	3.70 m
2015	African Games	Brazzaville, Republic of the Congo	2nd	Pole vault	4.10 m
2016	African Championships	Durban, South Africa	2nd	Pole vault	3.80 m
2017	Arab Championships	Radès, Tunisia	1st	Pole vault	4.15 m
2018	Mediterranean Games	Tarragona, Spain	6th	Pole vault	4.11 m
2018	African Championships	Asaba, Nigeria	1st	Pole vault	4.10 m
2019	Arab Championships	Cairo, Egypt	1st	Pole vault	4.00 m
2019	African Games	Rabat, Morocco	1st	Pole vault	4.31 m
2021	Arab Championships	Radès, Tunisia	1st	Pole vault	3.90 m
2022	African Championships	Port Louis, Mauritius	2nd	Pole vault	3.70 m
2023	Arab Championships	Marrakesh, Morocco	1st	Pole vault	3.90 m
2024	African Games	Accra, Ghana	2nd	Pole vault	3.70 m
2024	African Championships	Douala, Cameroon	2nd	Pole vault	3.90 m
2025	Arab Championships	Oran, Algeria	1st	Pole vault	3.85 m
2026	African Championships	Accra, Ghana	2nd	Pole vault	3.70 m
