= Athletics at the 2019 African Games – Women's shot put =

The women's shot put event at the 2019 African Games was held on 30 August in Rabat, Morocco.

Oyesade Olatoye represented Nigeria and won two medals. She won the gold medal in the women's shot put during the first round attempt, of 16.61. She then qualified for the World Championships. She won a bronze medal as well, in the hammer throw competition, with a 63.97 distance.

== Results ==
Rank	Name	Nationality	#1	#2	#3	#4	#5	#6	Result	Notes
1st place, gold medalist(s)	Ischke Senekal	South Africa	x	14.24	x	15.77	15.95	16.18	16.18	
2nd place, silver medalist(s)	Mieke Strydom	South Africa	13.77	13.24	13.81	13.60	14.64	14.24	14.64	
3rd place, bronze medalist(s)	Odile Ahouanwanou	Benin	12.95	12.73	13.10	13.77	13.31	13.32	13.77	
4	Zineb Zeroual	Morocco	13.14	13.25	13.39	13.35	12.95	12.94	13.39	
5	Zurga Usman	Ethiopia	12.48	13.21	13.19	13.09	12.59	13.01	13.21	
6	Sali Nadounke	Burkina Faso	x	12.89	11.99	12.20	12.49	12.29	12.89	
	Auriole Dongmo	Cameroon							DNS	
DQ	Oyesade Olatoye	Nigeria	16.61	16.06	16.05	16.10	15.26	16.30	~~16.61~~	
