= Athletics at the 2011 All-Africa Games – Women's pole vault =

The women's pole vault event at the 2011 All-Africa Games was held on 12 September.

== Results ==
Rank	Athlete	Nationality	2.00	3.00	3.20	3.40	3.60	3.70	Result	Notes
1st place, gold medalist(s)	Dora Mahfoudhi	Tunisia	–	–	o	o	xxo	xxx	3.60	=PB
2nd place, silver medalist(s)	Alima Ouattara	Ivory Coast	–	o	o	xxx			3.20	
	Romaissa Belabioud	Algeria	x–						NM	
	Olfa Lafi	Tunisia	xxx						NM	
	Queen Obisesan	Nigeria	xxx						NM	
