= Mariama Keïta =

Niger journalist (1946–2018)

- Born: 1946; Niamey, Niger
- Died: 29 October 2018 (aged 72); Turkey
- Occupations: Journalist, presenter, communication advisor, activist, producer
- Employer(s): La Voix du Sahel, Higher Council of Communication of Niger (CSC)
- Organization(s): Association for Democracy, Freedom and Development
- Known for: Head of one of the country's first NGOs, the Association for Democracy, Freedom and Development

Mariama Keïta, born in 1946, was a Nigerien journalist and the country's first female journalist and feminist activist. She died on October 29, 2018.

== Biography ==
Keïta was born in 1946 in Niamey. She began her career at the age of 18 as an intern at Radio Niger known as the Niger first radio station. She was later worked as an editor and presenter of a newspaper and on the public radio station La Voix du Sahel. In 1993, Keïta was a tireless advocate for democracy, human rights and women's rights in Niger and participated in the popularization of the Constitution of Niger, which allowed the holding of the first democratic elections of the country.

Keïta also co-founded the Coordination of Niger Women's NGOs and Associations, a coalition that worked closely with various stakeholders, including religious and community leaders, to advance women's rights in areas such as marriage and divorce. She worked as a teacher, mediator and communications consultant, sharing her knowledge and skills with the next generation. She authored articles and papers, spoke at conferences, and received numerous national and international awards for her impactful work.

A feminist activist and figure, she was a pioneer in the defense of women's rights in Niger. She served as the coordinator of about fifty non-governmental organizations and women's associations in Niger. She is also the head of one of the country's first NGOs, the Association for Democracy, Freedom and Development.

== Impact and death ==
Keïta served as President of the Conseil supérieur de la communication (CSC), a Nigerien media regulatory body from 2003 to 2006.

Keïta died in Turkey on 29 October 2018, at the age of 72, following a prolonged illness.
