= Syrine Ebondo =

Tunisian pole vaulter (born 1983)

Medal record

Women's athletics

Representing Tunisia

African Championships
Gold medal – first place	2000 Algiers	Pole vault
Gold medal – first place	2002 Tunis	Pole vault
Gold medal – first place	2004 Brazzaville	Pole vault
Gold medal – first place	2006 Bambous	Pole vault
Gold medal – first place	2012 Porto-Novo	Pole vault
Gold medal – first place	2014 Marrakesh	Pole vault
Gold medal – first place	2016 Durban	Pole vault

African Games
Gold medal – first place	2015 Brazzaville	Pole vault

Syrine Ebondo (née Balti; born 31 October 1983) is a Tunisian track and field athlete who competes in the pole vault. She is one of Africa's top pole vaulters and is a seven-time African champion. Her personal best of 4.21 metres, set in 2006, was the Tunisian record for the event until it was surpassed by Dorra Mahfoudhi in Rabat 2019 (4.31 metres).

== Athletic career ==
Born in Tunis, she won her first international medal at the age of fifteen, taking the pole vault title at the 1999 African Junior Athletics Championships. She became the first women's pole vault champion at the 1999 Pan Arab Games, following its introduction into the programme. Balti cleared four metres for the first time in 2000 and went on to claim the gold medal at the 2000 African Championships in Athletics. From 2001 onwards she based her training in Toulouse in France. That year she achieved an African junior indoor record of 4.10 metres.

She was ninth at the 2001 Francophone Games and sixth at the 2001 Mediterranean Games. In 2002, she came ninth at the 2002 World Junior Championships in Athletics then defended her title at the African Championships. A personal best of 4.10 metres at the 2002 IAAF World Cup was also an African junior record mark. She vaulted 4.20 metres indoors in 2003 (a Tunisian record) and matched that height outdoors in 2004. A third straight African championship title came that year, and she also defended her crown at the 2004 Pan Arab Games.

Her 2005 season was highlighted by a win at the Arab Athletics Championships and a silver medal at the 2005 Francophone Games. She equalled her indoor record of 4.20 m at the French Championships and set an outright best of 4.21 m for a fourth consecutive win at the 2006 African Championships, which was also a championship record). She was again chosen as Africa's representative at the 2006 IAAF World Cup and she finished in seventh.

Her 2007 season was curtailed and she dropped out of the sport altogether, not returning until the 2012 season. She came back to win her fifth gold medal at the 2012 African Championships in Athletics. She won her sixth gold medal at the 2014 African Championships in Athletics, tying Moroccan discus thrower Zoubida Laayouni for the most individual wins by a woman at the African Championships.

== Competition record ==
Year	Competition	Venue	Position	Notes
Representing Tunisia
1999	African Junior Championships	Tunis, Tunisia	1st	3.65 m
1999	Pan Arab Games	Amman, Jordan	1st	3.60 m
1999	All-Africa Games	Johannesburg, South Africa	–	NM
2000	African Championships	Algiers, Algeria	1st	3.85 m
2001	Jeux de la Francophonie	Ottawa, Canada	9th	3.75 m
2001	Mediterranean Games	Radès, Tunisia	6th	3.70 m
2002	World Junior Championships	Kingston, Jamaica	9th	3.90 m
2002	African Championships	Radès, Tunisia	1st	4.06 m
2004	African Championships	Brazzaville, Republic of the Congo	1st	4.00 m
2004	Pan Arab Games	Algiers, Algeria	1st	3.90 m
2005	Arab Championships	Radès, Tunisia	1st	3.80 m
2005	Jeux de la Francophonie	Niamey, Niger	2nd	4.05 m
2006	African Championships	Bambous, Mauritius	1st	4.21 m
2012	African Championships	Porto-Novo, Benin	1st	3.80 m
2013	Arab Championships	Doha, Qatar	1st	4.10 m
2013	Jeux de la Francophonie	Nice, France	3rd	4.10 m
2014	African Championships	Marrakesh, Morocco	1st	4.10 m
2015	African Games	Brazzaville, Republic of the Congo	1st	4.10 m
2016	African Championships	Durban, South Africa	1st	4.00 m
2017	Islamic Solidarity Games	Baku, Azerbaijan	3rd	4.00 m
