= Chinwe Okoro =

Nigerian athlete (born 1989)

Medal record

Women's athletics

Representing Nigeria

African Championships
Gold medal – first place	2012 Porto-Novo	Shot put
Gold medal – first place	2012 Porto-Novo	Discus throw
Gold medal – first place	2014 Marrakesh	Discus throw
Silver medal – second place	2014 Marrakesh	Shot put
Silver medal – second place	2016 Durban	Discus throw
Silver medal – second place	2018 Asaba	Discus throw

Chinwe Okoro (born 20 June 1989) is a Nigerian track and field athlete who competes in the shot put and the discus throw. She is a three-time African champion and holds the Nigerian record for the discus throw at 59.79 m (196 ft 1 3/4 in).

== Career ==
Okoro grew up in Kentucky, attending high school in Russell, and holds dual Nigerian-American citizenship. She attended the University of Louisville and combined athletics and academics as a student-athlete. She won the American junior title in the shot put in 2008 and was an NCAA All-American in 2011. Her high marks in her physical therapy studies made her a five-time Big East Conference All-Academic, and she later won the Michael Hale Scholarship to continue with her studies via a doctorate at Bellarmine University.

Her first international competition came at the 2008 World Junior Championships in Athletics, where she finished tenth in the shot put. Her first senior medals followed at the 2012 African Championships in Athletics, where she won the discus throw and was runner-up to Vivian Chukwuemeka in the shot put in a Nigerian medal sweep. Chukwuemeka was later disqualified for doping, however, elevating Okoro to double throws champion at the event.

Okoro missed the 2013 season but returned improved the year after and successfully defended her discus title at the 2014 African Championships in Athletics with a championship record and personal best throw of 59.79 m (196 ft 1 3/4 in). She was again runner-up in the shot put, with Cameroon's Auriol Dongmo being the women's champion on that occasion. She represented Africa in both throws events at the 2014 IAAF Continental Cup, held a month later at the same venue in Marrakesh, and was sixth in shot put and seventh in discus.

Okoro qualified for the 2016 Olympics in Rio de Janeiro with a throw of 61.58. She represented Nigeria in the discus throw and finished 14th out of 34.

== Personal bests ==
- Shot put: 17.39 m (57 ft 1/2 in) (2012)
- Discus throw: 61.58 m (202 ft 1/4 in) (2016) NR

== International competitions ==
Year	Competition	Venue	Position	Event	Notes
2008	World Junior Championships	Bydgoszcz, Poland	10th	Shot put	15.18 m
2012	African Championships	Porto-Novo, Benin	1st	Shot put	16.21 m
2012	African Championships	Porto-Novo, Benin	1st	Discus throw	56.60 m
2014	African Championships	Marrakesh, Morocco	2nd	Shot put	16.40 m
2014	African Championships	Marrakesh, Morocco	1st	Discus throw	59.79 m CR
2014	IAAF Continental Cup	Marrakesh, Morocco	6th	Shot put	16.35 m
2014	IAAF Continental Cup	Marrakesh, Morocco	7th	Discus throw	52.30 m
2016	Olympic Games	Rio de Janeiro, Brazil	14th (q)	Discus throw	58.85 m
2018	African Championships	Asaba, Nigeria	2nd	Discus throw	57.37 m
