= Jessica Inchude =

Bissau-Guinean athlete

Personal information
- Full name: Jessica da Silva Inchude
- Born: 25 March 1996 (age 30) Almada, Lisbon, Setúbal, Portugal
- Height: 175 cm (5 ft 9 in)

Sport
- Country: Portugal & Guinea-Bissau
- Sport: Athletics
- Events: Shot put & Discus throw
Medal record
Women's athletics
Representing Guinea-Bissau
Islamic Solidarity Games
Gold medal – first place	2017 Baku	Discus throw
African Championships
Silver medal – second place	2018 Asaba	Shot put
Representing Portugal
Ibero-American Championships
Gold medal – first place	2022 Alicante	Shot put
European Throwing Cup
Gold medal – first place	2025 Nicosia	Shot put
Mediterranean Games
Silver medal – second place	2026 Taranto	Shot put

Jessica da Silva Inchude (born 25 March 1996) is a shot putter and discus thrower who has competed for Guinea-Bissau and Portugal.

At the 2016 African Championships she finished fourth in the shot put and ninth in the discus throw. At the 2017 Islamic Solidarity Games she won the gold medal in the discus and finished fourth in the shot put.

Inchude competed in the women's shot put event at the 2016 Summer Olympics for Guinea-Bissau, where she finished 36th with a distance of 15.15 metres. She did not advance to the final. She also competed at the 2017 World Championships without reaching the final.

She competed in the women's shot put event at the 2024 Summer Olympics, this time for Portugal, where she advanced to the final and finished 8th.
