= Leila Ben Youssef =

Tunisian-American pole vaulter

Personal information
- Full name: Leila Maryam Ben Youssef
- Nationality: American, Tunisian
- Born: 13 November 1981 (age 44) Sidney, Montana, United States
- Height: 1.60 m (5 ft 3 in)
- Weight: 55 kg (121 lb)

Sport
- Sport: Athletics
- Event: Pole vault
- Team: Stanford Cardinal
- Coached by: Scott Slover

Achievements and titles
- Personal bests: Outdoor: 4.30 m (2008); Indoor: 4.11 m (2008)
Medal record
Women's athletics
Representing Tunisia
All-Africa Games
Gold medal – first place	2007 Algiers	Pole vault
African Championships
Gold medal – first place	2008 Addis Ababa	Pole vault

Leila Maryam Ben Youssef (Arabic: ليلى مريم بن يوسف; born November 13, 1981, in Sidney, Montana, United States) is a Tunisian-American pole vaulter. She is a multiple-time Tunisian record holder in the pole vault, and a gold medalist at the 2007 All-Africa Games in Algiers, Algeria. She also holds a dual citizenship, and chose to represent her father's birthplace Tunisia at numerous sporting events, including the Olympic games.

== Athletic career ==
Born in Sidney, Montana, to a Tunisian father and a French mother, Ben Youssef started out her athletic career in pole vault at the age of fourteen. She excelled at her sport and academics throughout her years at Sidney High School, where she became a three-time Class A state champion, and posted a personal record of 12 feet and 7.5 inches (3.84 metres). Coming out of high school in 2000, Ben Youssef attended Stanford University in Stanford, California, on a full academic and sport scholarship. She majored in human biology, minored in archaeology, and competed for the University's track and field team as a member of Stanford Cardinal. After completing her undergraduate degree in 2004, Ben Youssef also earned a master's degree of medical anthropology from the University.

Since graduating from Stanford University in 2005, Ben Youssef continued to compete for pole vault this time, as a member of the Tunisian national track and field team. In 2007, she reached her breakthrough season by winning gold medals at the Pan Arab Games in Cairo, Egypt, and at the All-Africa Games in Algiers, Algeria, with a height of 3.80 and 3.85 metres, respectively. The following year, Ben Youssef improved her performance at the African Championships in Addis Ababa, Ethiopia, when she cleared 4.00 metres to clinch another career gold medal. She also set a national record, and vaulted a personal best of 4.30 metres at an athletics meet in Los Gatos, California, earning her a spot on the Tunisian team for the Olympics.

At the 2008 Summer Olympics in Beijing, Ben Youssef successfully cleared a height of 4.00 metres in the women's pole vault. Unfortunately, she fell short in her bid for the final, as she placed thirty-second overall in the qualifying rounds, tying her position with Finland's Vanessa Vandy. She was hampered by abdominal pain due to a benign tumour.

Shortly after the Olympics, Ben Youssef announced her retirement from pole vault to pursue her studies at the University of Washington School of Medicine at Montana State University in Bozeman.

In 2024 she works as an emergency medicine physician in Hawaii and volunteers as a pole vault coach for a local high school.
