= List of African Athletics Championships records =

The African Championships in Athletics is a quadrennial event which began in 1979. Confederation of African Athletics accepts only athletes who are representing one of the organisation's African member states and the body recognises records set at editions of the African Athletics Championships.

== Men's records ==
Not ratified or later rescinded by CAA

Event	Record	Name	Nationality	Date	Meet	Place	Ref.
100 m	9.94	Seun Ogunkoya	Nigeria	19 August 1998	1998 Championships	Dakar, Senegal	
200 m	19.99	Frankie Fredericks	Namibia	22 August 1998	1998 Championships	Dakar, Senegal	
400 m	44.23	Isaac Makwala	Botswana	12 August 2014	2014 Championships	Marrakesh, Morocco	
800 m	1:42.84 A	David Rudisha	Kenya	30 July 2010	2010 Championships	Nairobi, Kenya	
1500 m	3:33.95	Brian Komen	Kenya	26 June 2024	2024 Championships	Douala, Cameroon	
5000 m	13:09.68	Simon Chemoiywo	Kenya	27 June 1993	1993 Championships	Durban, South Africa	
10,000 m	27:19.74	Kenneth Kipkemoi	Kenya	28 June 2012	2012 Championships	Porto-Novo, Benin	
110 m hurdles	13.49 (+0.4 m/s)	Louis François Mendy	Senegal	25 June 2024	2024 Championships	Douala, Cameroon	
110 m hurdles	13.43 NWI (Note: by World Athletics source; 13.45 by CAA source)	Antonio Alkana	South Africa	25 June 2016	2016 Championships	Durban, South Africa	
400 m hurdles	48.29	Amadou Dia Ba	Senegal	16 August 1985	1985 Championships	Cairo, Egypt	
3000 m steeplechase	8:11.03	Paul Kipsiele Koech	Kenya	11 August 2006	2006 Championships	Bambous, Mauritius	
High jump	2.34 m	Abderrahmane Hammad	Algeria	14 July 2000	2000 Championships	Algiers, Algeria	
High jump	2.34 m	Kabelo Kgosiemang	Botswana	4 May 2008	2008 Championships	Addis Ababa, Ethiopia	
Pole vault	5.41 m	Cheyne Rahme	South Africa	13 August 2014	2014 Championships	Marrakesh, Morocco	
Long jump	8.45 m (−1.2 m/s)	Rushwal Samaai	South Africa	2 August 2018	2018 Championships	Asaba, Nigeria	
Triple jump	17.23 m	Andrew Owusu	Ghana	19 August 1998	1998 Championships	Dakar, Senegal	
Shot put	21.20 m	Chukwuebuka Enekwechi	Nigeria	12 June 2022	2022 Championships	Saint Pierre, Mauritius	
Discus throw	63.90 m NR	Oussama Khennoussi	Algeria	23 June 2024	2024 Championships	Douala, Cameroon	
Hammer throw	79.09 m	Mostafa Al-Gamel	Egypt	13 August 2014	2014 Championships	Marrakesh, Morocco	
Javelin throw	87.26 m	Tom Petranoff	South Africa	28 June 1992	1992 Championships	Belle Vue Harel, Mauritius	
Decathlon	8311 pts	Larbi Bourrada	Algeria	10–11 August 2014	2014 Championships	Marrakesh, Morocco	
Decathlon	100m / Long jump / Shot put / High jump / 400m / 110m H / Discus / Pole vault / Javelin / 1500m; 10.90 (+1.0 m/s) / 7.45 m (+1.1 m/s) / 13.20 m / 2.04 m / 48.33 / 14.33 (+0.2 m/s) / 39.99 m / 4.90 m / 64.60 m / 4:20.05						
20 km walk	1:18:47 NR	Misgana Wakuma	Ethiopia	16 May 2026	African Championships	Accra, Ghana	
4 × 100 m relay	38.25	Akani Simbine; Simon Magakwe; Emile Erasmus; Henricho Bruintjies	South Africa	3 August 2018	2018 Championships	Asaba, Nigeria	
4 × 400 m relay	3:00.92	Aron Koech; Alphas Kishoyian; Jared Momanyi; Emmanuel Korir	Kenya	5 August 2018	2018 Championships	Asaba, Nigeria	

== Women's records ==
Event	Record	Name	Nationality	Date	Meet	Place	Ref.
100 m	10.99 (+2.0 m/s)	Murielle Ahouré	Ivory Coast	23 June 2016	2016 Championships	Durban, South Africa	
200 m	22.22	Falilat Ogunkoya	Nigeria	22 August 1998	1998 Championships	Dakar, Senegal	
400 m	49.54 NR	Amantle Montsho	Botswana	29 June 2012	2012 Championships	Porto-Novo, Benin	
800 m	1:56.06	Caster Semenya	South Africa	5 August 2018	2018 Championships	Asaba, Nigeria	
1500 m	4:01.99 PB	Caster Semenya	South Africa	24 June 2016	2016 Championships	Durban, South Africa	
5000 m	15:00.82	Beatrice Chebet	Kenya	9 June 2022	2016 Championships	Saint Pierre, Mauritius	
10,000 m	30:26.94 PB	Alice Aprot	Kenya	25 June 2016	2016 Championships	Durban, South Africa	
100 m hurdles	12.70 (+1.1 m/s) NR	Ebony Morrison	Liberia	22 June 2024	2024 Championships	Douala, Cameroon	
400 m hurdles	54.24	Nezha Bidouane	Morocco	22 August 1998	1998 Championships	Dakar, Senegal	
3000 m steeplechase	8:59.88	Beatrice Chepkoech	Kenya	5 August 2018	2018 Championships	Asaba, Nigeria	
High jump	1.95 m	Lucienne N'Da	Ivory Coast	28 June 1992	1992 Championships	Belle Vue Harel, Mauritius	
High jump	1.95 m	Hestrie Cloete	South Africa	7 August 2002	2002 Championships	Radès, Tunisia	
Pole vault	4.30 m	Ansume de Beer	South Africa	13 May 2026	2026 Championships	Accra, Ghana	
Long jump	6.96 m (+1.7 m/s)	Blessing Okagbare	Nigeria	30 June 2012	2012 Championships	Porto-Novo, Benin	
Triple jump	14.95 m	Françoise Mbango Etone	Cameroon	6 August 2002	2002 Championships	Radès, Tunisia	
Shot put	17.64 m	Auriol Dongmo	Cameroon	26 June 2016	2016 Championships	Durban, South Africa	
Shot put	18.86 m X	Vivian Chukwuemeka	Nigeria	1 July 2012	2012 Championships	Porto-Novo, Benin	
Discus throw	59.79 m	Chinwe Okoro	Nigeria	12 August 2014	2014 Championships	Marrakesh, Morocco	
Hammer throw	69.82 m	Zahra Tatar	Algeria	13 May 2026	African Championships	Accra, Ghana	
Javelin throw	65.32 m	Sunette Viljoen	South Africa	13 August 2014	2014 Championships	Marrakesh, Morocco	
Heptathlon	6153 pts NR	Uhunoma Osazuwa	Nigeria	24–25 June 2016	2016 Championships	Durban, South Africa	
Heptathlon	100m H / High jump / Shot put / 200m / Long jump / Javelin / 800m; 13.32 (+1.4 m/s) / 1.83 m / 12.87 m / 24.19 (NWI) / 6.24 m (±0.0 m/s) / 36.30 m / 2:17.50						
20 km walk (road)	1:30:43 AR	Grace Wanjiru Njue	Kenya	26 June 2016	2016 Championships	Durban, South Africa	
4 × 100 m relay	42.94	Rosemary Nwankwo; Obi Jennifer Chukwuka; Rosemary Chukwuma; Miracle Ezechukwu	Nigeria	15 May 2026	African Championships	Accra, Ghana	
4 × 400 m relay	3:27.31	Patience Okon George; Elizabeth Joseph; Omolara Ogunmakinju; Ella Onojuvwevwo	Nigeria	26 June 2024	2024 Championships	Douala, Cameroon	

== Mixed ==
Event	Record	Name	Nationality	Date	Meet	Place	Ref.
4 × 400 m relay	3:13.12 NR	Gardeo Isaacs; Shirley Nekhubui; Mthi Mthimkulu; Miranda Coetzee	South Africa	22 June 2024	2024 Championships	Douala, Cameroon	

Key:
^{WR} World record	^{AR} African record	^{NR} National record	^{PB} Athlete's personal best
