= Algeria at the 2024 African Championships in Athletics =

- Flag of Algeria
- WA code: ALG

in Douala, Cameroon 21 June 2024 – 26 June 2024
- Competitors: 18 (13 men and 5 women)
- Medals: Gold 3 Silver 3 Bronze 3 Total 9

Algeria competed at the 2024 African Championships in Athletics in Douala, Cameroon, from 21 to 26 June 2024.

== Medalists ==
Medal	Athlete	Event	Date
Gold	Larbi Bourrada	Men's decathlon	June 22
Gold	Zahra Tatar	Women's hammer throw	June 22
Gold	Oussama Khennoussi	Men's discus throw	June 23
Silver	Dhiae Bouchicha	Men's decathlon	June 22
Silver	Amine Bouanani	Men's 110 metres hurdles	June 25
Silver	Souad Azzi	Women's 20 kilometres walk	June 25
Bronze	Zouina Bouzebra	Women's hammer throw	June 22
Bronze	Abdelmalik Lahoulou	Men's 400 metres hurdles	June 23
Bronze	Mehdi Amar Rouana	Men's pole vault	June 25

== Results ==
Algeria entered 18 athletes.

Key

- Q = Qualified for the next round
- q = Qualified for the next round as a fastest loser or, in field events, by position without achieving the qualifying target

=== Men ===
Track and road events

Athlete	Event	Heat		Semifinal		Final	
Athlete	Event	Result	Rank	Result	Rank	Result	Rank
Abdennour Bendjemaa	400 metres	46.74	4 q	46.61	7	Did not advance	
Said Ameri	5000 metres	—N/a				13:52.62	8
Amine Bouanani	110 metres hurdles	13.60	1 Q	—N/a		13.59	2nd place, silver medalist(s)
Abdelmalik Lahoulou	400 metres hurdles	50.43	1 Q	—N/a		49.36	3rd place, bronze medalist(s)
Bilal Tabti	3000 metres steeplechase	—N/a				8:41.68	7
Hicham Bouchicha	3000 metres steeplechase	—N/a				DNS	
Ismail Benhammouda	20 kilometres walk	—N/a				1:29:08	4
Aymen Ben Saha	20 kilometres walk	—N/a				1:38:00	7

Field events

Athlete	Event	Qualification		Final	
Athlete	Event	Distance	Position	Distance	Position
Mehdi Amar Rouana	Pole vault	—N/a		5.10	3rd place, bronze medalist(s)
Louai Lamraoui	Long jump	7.34	12 q	7.29	11
Oussama Khennoussi	Discus throw	—N/a		63.90	1st place, gold medalist(s)

Combined events – Decathlon

Athlete	Event	100 m	LJ	SP	HJ	400 m	110H	DT	PV	JT	1500 m	Final	Rank
Larbi Bourrada	Result	11.14	6.82	11.72	1.93	50.07	14.85	37.67	4.80	55.49	4:36.52	7447	1st place, gold medalist(s)
Larbi Bourrada	Points	830	771	589	740	811	868	617	849	670	702	7447	1st place, gold medalist(s)
Dhiae Bouchicha	Result	10.78	6.74	10.86	1.99	47.14	15.94	34.52	4.20	42.40	4:17.89	7215	2nd place, silver medalist(s)
Dhiae Bouchicha	Points	910	753	537	794	951	740	554	673	477	826	7215	2nd place, silver medalist(s)

=== Women ===
Track and road events

Athlete	Event	Final	
Athlete	Event	Result	Rank
Souad Azzi	20 kilometres walk	1:40:36	2nd place, silver medalist(s)
Melissa Touloum	20 kilometres walk	1:48:58	7

Field events

Athlete	Event	Final	
Athlete	Event	Distance	Position
Darina Hadil Rezik	High jump	1.70	9
Zahra Tatar	Hammer throw	67.82	1st place, gold medalist(s)
Zouina Bouzebra	Hammer throw	65.48	3rd place, bronze medalist(s)
