= 2024 African Championships in Athletics – Women's shot put =

Women's shot put at the 2024 African Championships in Athletics
- Venue: Japoma Stadium
- Location: Douala, Cameroon
- Dates: 24 June
- Competitors: 10 from 6 nations
- Winning distance: 18.17 m NR, AU20R

Medalists
| gold medal | Ashley Erasmus | South Africa |
| silver medal | Miné De Klerk | South Africa |
| bronze medal | Colette Uys | South Africa |

The women's shot put event at the 2024 African Championships in Athletics was held on 24 June in Douala, Cameroon.

== Records ==
Records before the 2024 African Athletics Championships
| Record | Athlete (nation) | Distance (m) | Location | Date |
|---|---|---|---|---|
| World record | Natalya Lisovskaya (URS) | 22.63 | Moscow, Soviet Union | 7 June 1987 |
| African record | Vivian Chukwuemeka (NGR) | 18.43 | Walnut, United States | 19 April 2003 |
| Championship record | Vivian Chukwuemeka (NGR) | 17.60 | Radès, Tunisia | 10 August 2002 |
| World leading | Sarah Mitton (CAN) | 15.01 | Fleetwood, United States | 11 May 2024 |
| African leading | No distances recorded | | | |

== Results ==
| Rank | Athlete | Nationality | #1 | #2 | #3 | #4 | #5 | #6 | Result | Notes |
|---|---|---|---|---|---|---|---|---|---|---|
| 1st place, gold medalist(s) | Ashley Erasmus | South Africa | 16.41 | 18.17 | 16.66 | 16.83 | 16.79 | 18.02 | 18.17 | NR, AU20R |
| 2nd place, silver medalist(s) | Miné De Klerk | South Africa | 16.41 | 14.07 | x | 16.89 | 17.09 | x | 17.09 | |
| 3rd place, bronze medalist(s) | Colette Uys | South Africa | 16.04 | 15.77 | 16.28 | 15.94 | x | x | 16.28 | |
| 4 | Annie Nabwe | Liberia | x | x | 14.67 | 16.01 | 15.38 | 14.97 | 16.01 | |
| 5 | Frédéric Lemongo Nkoulou | Cameroon | 14.71 | 14.49 | 14.14 | 14.44 | 15.16 | x | 15.16 | |
| 6 | Carine Mekam | Gabon | x | 14.71 | 14.55 | 14.59 | 14.67 | x | 14.71 | |
| 7 | Nora Monie | Cameroon | 14.00 | 14.25 | x | 13.83 | x | 14.52 | 14.52 | |
| 8 | Nassira Koné | Mali | 12.92 | 12.21 | 12.73 | 11.90 | 12.29 | 12.34 | 12.92 | |
| 9 | Aynalem Negash | Ethiopia | 10.51 | 11.23 | 10.95 | | | | 11.23 | |
| 10 | Merhawit Tsehaye | Ethiopia | 10.33 | 10.29 | 9.54 | | | | 10.33 | |
| | Nada Charoudi | Tunisia | | | | | | | DNS | |

== See also ==
- Athletics at the 2023 African Games – Women's shot put
