= Athletics at the 2025 Summer World University Games – Women's shot put =

Women's shot put at the 2025 Summer World University Games
- Venue: Lohrheidestadion
- Location: Bochum, Germany
- Dates: 21 July (qualification); 22 July (final)
- Competitors: 30 from 23 nations
- Winning distance: 18.45 m

Medalists
gold medal	Axelina Johansson	Sweden
silver medal	Abria Smith	United States
bronze medal	Colette Uys	South Africa

The women's shot put event at the 2025 Summer World University Games was held in Bochum, Germany, at Lohrheidestadion on 21 and 22 July.

== Records ==
Prior to the competition, the records were as follows:

Record	Athlete (nation)	Distance (m)	Location	Date
Games record	Nadezhda Chizhova (URS)	20.82 m	Moscow, Soviet Union	20 August 1973

== Results ==
=== Qualification ===
All athletes over 17.00 m (Q) or at least the 12 best performers (q) advance to the final.

==== Group A ====
Place	Athlete	Nation	#1	#2	#3	Result	Notes
1	Axelina Johansson	Sweden	17.25			17.25 m	Q
2	Colette Uys	South Africa	16.83	16.19	16.27	16.83 m	q
3	Chiang Ching-yuan	Chinese Taipei	16.60	x	16.46	16.60 m	q
4	Sara Verteramo	Italy	15.19	15.35	15.48	15.48 m	q
5	Miryam Mazenauer	Switzerland	15.42	x	x	15.42 m	q
6	Renáta Beregszászi	Hungary	x	x	15.41	15.41 m	
7	Shiksha	India	14.78	15.27	14.85	15.27 m	
8	Pınar Akyol	Turkey	x	15.22	13.91	15.22 m	
9	Sojin Park	South Korea	14.59	14.26	14.53	14.59 m	
10	Elena Defrère	Belgium	14.25	x	14.58	14.58 m	
11	Nani Shahirah Maryata	Malaysia	12.63	12.46	14.57	14.57 m	
12	Amy Kennedy	Great Britain	13.70	14.46	x	14.46 m	
13	Natália Váleková	Slovakia	13.40	x	11.65	13.48 m	
14	Jessica Gyamfi	Canada	12.50	12.38		12.50 m	
15	Sakina Hajizada	Azerbaijan	10.62	11.40	12.23	12.23 m	

==== Group B ====
Place	Athlete	Nation	#1	#2	#3	Result	Notes
1	Abria Smith	United States	16.39	17.90		17.90 m	Q
2	Miné de Klerk	South Africa	16.69	x	16.96	16.96 m	q
3	Sun Yue	China	16.93	r		16.93 m	q
4	Zuzanna Maślana	Poland	15.01	16.05	x	16.05 m	q
5	Martina Mazurová	Czech Republic	14.34	15.93	x	15.93 m	q
6	Mariela Pérez	Chile	15.27	15.55	15.53	15.55 m	q
7	Liv Sands	Canada	15.53	15.38	x	15.53 m	q
8	Sofiya Romasyuk	Ukraine	x	13.74	15.38	15.38 m	
9	Emilia Malmehed	Sweden	14.01	14.71	14.30	14.71 m	
10	Poorna Raorane	India	14.32	14.54	x	14.54 m	
11	Chien Chen-hsin	Chinese Taipei	14.32	14.01	14.14	14.32 m	
12	Réka Kling	Hungary	13.47	13.09	12.72	13.47 m	
13	Monika Marjová	Slovakia	13.44	13.18	x	13.44 m	
14	Sol Nahomi Zapata	Mexico	x	10.83	12.74	12.74 m	
15	Khadija Mahreen	Pakistan	9.70	10.07	10.78	10.78 m	

=== Final ===
Place	Athlete	Nation	#1	#2	#3	#4	#5	#6	Result	Notes
1st place, gold medalist(s)	Axelina Johansson	Sweden	17.57	17.52	17.90	18.45	x	18.24	18.45 m	
2nd place, silver medalist(s)	Abria Smith	United States	17.38	x	17.12	17.29	17.04	16.57	17.38 m	
3rd place, bronze medalist(s)	Colette Uys	South Africa	17.34	x	16.46	16.65	x	x	17.34 m	
4	Miné de Klerk	South Africa	16.65	x	x	16.95	17.33	17.13	17.33 m	
5	Sun Yue	China	x	17.00	17.21	16.86	16.98	16.84	17.21 m	
6	Chiang Ching-yuan	Chinese Taipei	16.17	x	16.28	16.22	16.97	x	16.97 m	
7	Martina Mazurová	Czech Republic	x	15.12	16.02	x	x	x	16.02 m	
8	Liv Sands	Canada	13.49	15.66	15.96	15.95	x	x	15.96 m	
9	Miryam Mazenauer	Switzerland	x	x	15.89				15.89 m	
10	Zuzanna Maślana	Poland	x	x	15.79				15.79 m	
11	Mariela Pérez	Chile	15.49	15.43	15.65				15.65 m	
12	Sara Verteramo	Italy	x	15.50	15.12				15.50 m	
