= 2026 African Championships in Athletics – Women's shot put =

Women's shot put at the 2026 African Championships in Athletics
- Venue: Legon Sports Stadium
- Location: Accra, Ghana
- Dates: 15 May
- Competitors: 6 from 5 nations
- Winning time: 17.63

Medalists
gold medal	Colette Uys	South Africa
silver medal	Carine Mekam Ndong	Gabon
bronze medal	Belinda Oburu	Kenya

The women's shot put event at the 2026 African Championships in Athletics was held on 15 May in Accra, Ghana.

== Results ==
Rank	Athlete	Nationality	#1	#2	#3	#4	#5	#6	Result	Notes
1st place, gold medalist(s)	Colette Uys	South Africa	16.62	17.63	x	17.24	16.60	17.35	17.63	
2nd place, silver medalist(s)	Carine Mekam Ndong	Gabon	15.24	x	16.71	15.86	16.04	x	16.71	
3rd place, bronze medalist(s)	Belinda Oburu	Kenya	15.06	x	15.19	15.80	14.30	16.39	16.39	
4	Divine Oladipo	Nigeria	15.25	x	16.10	x	x	x	16.10	
5	Sarah Otieno	Kenya	14.74	15.79	15.98	x	14.75	15.10	15.98	
6	Nora Monie	Cameroon	13.96	14.20	15.49	14.48	14.75	15.10	15.49	
	Nada Chroudi	Tunisia							DNS	
