= 2021 World Athletics U20 Championships – Women's discus throw =

Event at the 2021 World Athletics

Women's discus throw at the 2021 World Athletics U20 Championships
- Venue: Kasarani Stadium
- Dates: 20 August
- Competitors: 13 from 11 nations
- Winning distance: 57.84 m

Medalists
gold medal	Violetta Ignatyeva	Authorised Neutral Athletes
silver medal	Miné de Klerk	South Africa
bronze medal	Alina Nikitsenka	Belarus

The women's discus throw at the 2021 World Athletics U20 Championships was held at the Kasarani Stadium on 20 August.

== Records ==
Standing records prior to the 2021 World Athletics U20 Championships
World U20 Record	Ilke Wyludda (GDR)	74.40	East Berlin, East Germany	13 September 1988
Championship Record	Ilke Wyludda (GDR)	68.24	Sudbury, Canada	31 July 1988
World U20 Leading	Violetta Ignatyeva (RUS)	62.54	Sochi, Russia	21 April 2021

== Results ==
=== Final ===
The final was held on 20 August at 11:26.

Rank	Name	Nationality	Round						Mark	Notes
Rank	Name	Nationality	1	2	3	4	5	6	Mark	Notes
1st place, gold medalist(s)	Violetta Ignatyeva	Authorised Neutral Athletes	57.12	x	56.49	56.40	57.84	56.12	57.84	
2nd place, silver medalist(s)	Miné de Klerk	South Africa	48.28	53.26	51.77	53.33	x	53.50	53.50	AU20R
3rd place, bronze medalist(s)	Alina Nikitsenka	Belarus	47.71	48.94	51.47	x	x	50.64	51.47	
4	Sofia Kessidi	Greece	42.13	x	47.71	48.99	x	45.00	48.99	
5	Despoina Areti Filippidou	Greece	x	x	48.84	x	x	47.99	48.84	
6	Mahla Mahrooghi	Iran	46.30	48.75	46.43	x	46.44	46.07	48.75	
7	Cedricka Williams	Jamaica	48.65	x	x	x	x	x	48.65	
8	Benedetta Benedetti	Italy	41.62	47.49	x	x	44.69	x	47.49	
9	Chaima Chouikh	Tunisia	47.31	44.92	43.70				47.31	
10	Andreea Lungu	Romania	46.52	46.73	45.73				46.73	
11	Esther Osisike	Nigeria	44.68	x	44.17				44.68	
12	Bodine Degli Umberti	South Africa	42.13	x	x				42.13	
13	Linda Kageha	Kenya	40.22	x	x				40.22	NU20R
