= Violetta Ignatyeva =

Russian discus thrower

Personal information
- Nationality: Russian
- Born: 16 January 2002 (age 24)

Sport
- Country: Authorised Neutral Athletes
- Sport: Athletics
- Event: Discus throw

Achievements and titles
- Personal best: Outdoor: 62.54 m (2021)
Medal record
World U20 Championships
Gold medal – first place	2021 Nairobi	Discus throw
Youth Olympic Games
Silver medal – second place	2018 Buenos Aires	Discus throw

Violetta Ignatyeva (born 16 January 2002) is a Russian athlete who specializes in the discus throw, she however competes as part of the authorized neutral athletes. She was the gold medallist at the World Athletics U20 Championships in 2021.
