= Abria Smith =

American shot putter (born 2002)

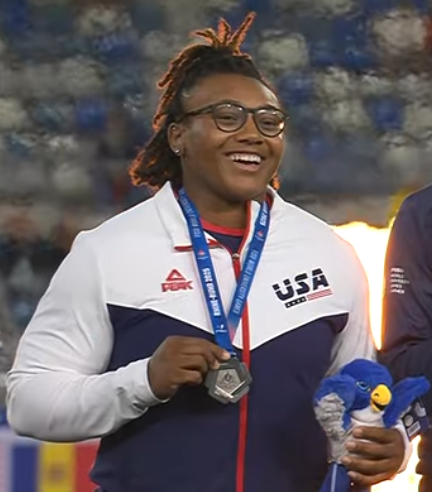
- At the 2025 Summer World University Games

Personal information
- Born: January 25, 2002 (age 24)

Sport
- Sport: Athletics
- Event: Shot put

Achievements and titles
- Personal bests: SP: 19.31m (New York, 2026)
Medal record
Women's athletics
Representing United States
Summer World University Games
Silver medal – second place	2025 Bochum	Shot put

Abria Deonna Celene Smith (born January 25, 2002) is an American shot putter. She was runner-up at the 2025 NCAA Outdoor Championships and the 2026 USA Indoor Track and Field Championships. She also won a silver medal at the 2025 Summer World University Games.

== Early life ==
From Chicago, she attended Homewood-Flossmoor High School and studied at Hampton University in Virginia before later transferring back to her home state and the University of Illinois.

== Career ==
Smith did not record a distance over 16 metres in the shot put during her three years at Hampton University, but began to throw consistently further distances the season after transferring to the University of Illinois, and working with coach JC Lambert. In April 2025, she threw 18.92 metres to win the Tom Jones Invitational in Gainesville, Florida. In May 2025, she won the Big Ten Outdoor Championships in Eugene, Oregon, with a throw of 17.95 metres. She was runner-up to Mya Lesnar at the 2025 NCAA Outdoor Championships in Eugene, Oregon, with a throw of 18.85 metres. She threw 18.75 metres at the Ed Murphey Classic in Memphis, Tennessee in July 2025. Later that month, she won a silver medal behind Axelina Johansson at the 2025 Summer World University Games in Germany, with a throw of 17.38 metres.

Smith placed second at the 2026 USA Indoor Track and Field Championships, finishing behind Chase Jackson with a personal best throw of 19.23 metres. She was seventh overall representing the United States at the 2026 World Athletics Indoor Championships in Toruń, Poland, with a best distance of 18.86 metres. On 25 July, she placed second with a personal best 19.31 metres at the 2026 USA Outdoor Track and Field Championships in New York.
