= 2024 African Championships in Athletics – Men's decathlon =

Men's decathlon at the 2024 African Championships in Athletics
- Venue: Japoma Stadium
- Location: Douala, Cameroon
- Dates: 21-22 June
- Competitors: 6 from 4 nations
- Winning score: 7447 pts

Medalists
gold medal	Larbi Bourrada	Algeria
silver medal	Dhiae Cherif Boudoumi	Algeria
bronze medal	Edwin Kipmutai Too	Kenya

The men's decathlon event at the 2024 African Championships in Athletics was held on 21 and 22 June in Douala, Cameroon.

== Records ==
Records before the 2024 African Athletics Championships
Record	Athlete (nation)	Points	Location	Date
World record	Kevin Mayer (FRA)	9126	Talence, France	16 September 2018
African record	Larbi Bourrada (ALG)	8521	Rio de Janeiro, Brazil	18 August 2016
Championship record	Larbi Bourrada (ALG)	8311	Marrakesh, Morocco	11 August 2014
World leading	Leo Neugebauer (GER)	8961	Eugene, United States	6 June 2024
African leading	No scores recorded			

== Medalists ==
Gold	Silver	Bronze
Larbi Bourrada; Algeria	Dhiae Cherif Boudoumi; Algeria	Edwin Kipmutai Too; Kenya

== Results ==
=== 100 metres ===
Wind: 0.0 m/s

Rank	Lane	Name	Nationality	Time	Points	Notes
1	6	Dhiae Cherif Boudoumi	Algeria	10.78	910	
2	1	Jefrey Emeka Nmesirionye	Nigeria	10.80	906	
3	2	Edwin Kipmutai Too	Kenya	10.98	865	
4	5	Jesse Perez	South Africa	11.12	834	
5	4	Larbi Bourrada	Algeria	11.14	830	
6	3	Friedrich Pretorius	South Africa	11.43	767	

=== Long jump ===
Rank	Athlete	Nationality	#1	#2	#3	Result	Points	Notes	Total
1	Edwin Kipmutai Too	Kenya	7.36	7.39	x	7.39	908		1773
2	Jefrey Emeka Nmesirionye	Nigeria	6.70	6.67	7.15	7.15	850		1756
3	Friedrich Pretorius	South Africa	6.70	6.95	6.77	6.95	802		1569
4	Larbi Bourrada	Algeria	6.54	6.82	6.48	6.82	771		1601
5	Dhiae Cherif Boudoumi	Algeria	6.55	6.74	x	6.74	753		1663
	Jesse Perez	South Africa				DNS	0		DNF

=== Shot put ===
Rank	Athlete	Nationality	#1	#2	#3	Result	Points	Notes	Total
1	Friedrich Pretorius	South Africa	13.05	13.73	13.41	7.39	712		2281
2	Larbi Bourrada	Algeria	11.69	11.72	x	11.72	589		2190
3	Dhiae Cherif Boudoumi	Algeria	9.87	10.86	10.21	10.86	537		2200
4	Jefrey Emeka Nmesirionye	Nigeria	10.21	10.60	x	10.60	522		2278
5	Edwin Kipmutai Too	Kenya	9.70	10.53	x	10.53	518		2291

=== High jump ===
Rank	Athlete	Nationality	1.81	1.84	1.87	1.90	1.93	1.96	1.99	2.02	2.05	2.08	Result	Points	Notes	Total
1	Jefrey Emeka Nmesirionye	Nigeria	o	o	o	o	–	xo	o	xo	xxo	xxx	2.05	850		3128
2	Dhiae Cherif Boudoumi	Algeria	o	o	o	o	o	o	o	xxx			1.99	794		2994
3	Larbi Bourrada	Algeria	o	o	xo	o	o	xxx					1.93	740		2930
4	Edwin Kipmutai Too	Kenya	xo	o	xo	o	xxo	xxx					1.93	740		3031
	Friedrich Pretorius	South Africa	xxx										NM	0		2281

=== 400 metres ===
Rank	Lane	Name	Nationality	Time	Points	Notes	Total
1	2	Dhiae Cherif Boudoumi	Algeria	47.14	951		3945
2	4	Edwin Kipmutai Too	Kenya	47.99	910		3941
3	1	Jefrey Emeka Nmesirionye	Nigeria	49.29	848		3976
4	3	Larbi Bourrada	Algeria	50.07	811		3741
5	6	Friedrich Pretorius	South Africa	50.84	776		3057

=== 110 metres hurdles ===
Wind: +0.4 m/s

Rank	Lane	Name	Nationality	Time	Points	Notes	Total
1	4	Friedrich Pretorius	South Africa	14.64	894		3951
2	5	Larbi Bourrada	Algeria	14.85	868		4609
3	2	Jefrey Emeka Nmesirionye	Nigeria	15.32	811		4787
4	3	Edwin Kipmutai Too	Kenya	15.32	811		4752
5	7	Dhiae Cherif Boudoumi	Algeria	15.94	740		4685

=== Discus throw ===
Rank	Athlete	Nationality	#1	#2	#3	Result	Points	Notes	Total
1	Edwin Kipmutai Too	Kenya	32.05	29.24	37.82	37.82	620		5372
2	Larbi Bourrada	Algeria	36.10	37.67	x	37.67	617		5226
3	Friedrich Pretorius	South Africa	35.95	35.64	36.19	36.19	588		4539
4	Jefrey Emeka Nmesirionye	Nigeria	34.01	x	34.63	34.63	556		5343
5	Dhiae Cherif Boudoumi	Algeria	x	33.57	34.52	34.52	554		5239

=== Pole vault ===
Rank	Athlete	Nationality	3.50	3.60	3.70	3.80	3.90	4.00	4.10	4.20	4.30	4.50	4.70	4.80	Result	Points	Notes	Total
1	Larbi Bourrada	Algeria	–	–	–	–	–	–	–	–	–	o	xxo	xxo	4.80	849		6075
2	Dhiae Cherif Boudoumi	Algeria	xo	o	o	o	o	?	o	xxo	xxx				4.20	673		5912
3	Friedrich Pretorius	South Africa	xo	–	o	–	xo	xxx							3.90	590		5129
4	Jefrey Emeka Nmesirionye	Nigeria	–	xxo	o	o	xxx								3.80	562		5905
5	Edwin Kipmutai Too	Kenya	–	–	o	xxx									3.70	535		5907

=== Javelin throw ===
Rank	Athlete	Nationality	#1	#2	#3	Result	Points	Notes	Total
1	Larbi Bourrada	Algeria	47.95	48.33	55.49	55.49	670		6745
2	Friedrich Pretorius	South Africa	49.26	51.03	–	51.03	604		5733
3	Edwin Kipmutai Too	Kenya	36.73	44.00	49.08	49.08	575		6482
4	Dhiae Cherif Boudoumi	Algeria	38.95	38.33	42.40	42.40	477		6389
5	Jefrey Emeka Nmesirionye	Nigeria	40.28	36.67	39.43	40.28	446		6351

=== 1500 metres ===
Rank	Name	Nationality	Time	Points	Notes
1	Dhiae Cherif Boudoumi	Algeria	4:17.89	826	
2	Larbi Bourrada	Algeria	4:36.52	702	
3	Jefrey Emeka Nmesirionye	Nigeria	4:44.84	650	
4	Edwin Kipmutai Too	Kenya	4:44.90	650	
	Friedrich Pretorius	South Africa	DNS	0	

=== Final standings ===
The highest mark recorded in each event is highlighted in yellow

Rank	Athlete	Nationality	100m	LJ	SP	HJ	400m	110m H	DT	PV	JT	1500m	Points	Notes
1st place, gold medalist(s)	Larbi Bourrada	Algeria	11.14	6.82	11.72	1.93	50.07	14.85	37.67	4.80	55.49	4:36.52	7447	
2nd place, silver medalist(s)	Dhiae Cherif Boudoumi	Algeria	10.78	6.74	10.86	1.99	47.14	15.94	34.52	4.20	42.40	4:17.89	7215	
3rd place, bronze medalist(s)	Edwin Kipmutai Too	Kenya	10.98	7.39	10.53	1.93	47.99	15.32	37.82	3.70	49.08	4:44.90	7132	
4	Jefrey Emeka Nmesirionye	Nigeria	10.80	7.15	10.60	2.05	49.29	15.32	34.63	3.80	40.28	4:44.84	6439	
	Friedrich Pretorius	South Africa	11.43	6.95	13.73	NM	50.84	14.64	36.19	3.90	51.03	DNS	DNF	
	Jesse Perez	South Africa	11.12	DNS	–	–	–	–	–	–	–	–	DNF	

== See also ==
- Athletics at the 2023 African Games – Men's decathlon
