= 2026 African Championships in Athletics – Men's decathlon =

Men's decathlon at the 2026 African Championships in Athletics
- Venue: Legon Sports Stadium
- Location: Accra, Ghana
- Dates: 12–13 May
- Competitors: 6 from 6 nations
- Winning time: 7284

Medalists
| gold medal | Nicolas Huys | Ivory Coast |
| silver medal | Edwin Too | Kenya |
| bronze medal | Morne van As | South Africa |

The men's decathlon event at the 2026 African Championships in Athletics was held on 12 and 13 May in Accra, Ghana.

== Results ==
The highest mark recorded in each event is highlighted in yellow

| Rank | Athlete | Nationality | 100m | LJ | SP | HJ | 400m | 110m H | DT | PV | JT | 1500m | Points | Notes |
|---|---|---|---|---|---|---|---|---|---|---|---|---|---|---|
| 1st place, gold medalist(s) | Nicolas Huys | Ivory Coast | 11.22 | 7.49w | 13.13 | 1.92 | 48.89 | 15.07 | 36.99 | 3.80 | 48.09 | 4:36.80 | 7284 | NR |
| 2nd place, silver medalist(s) | Edwin Too | Kenya | 11.12 | 7.47w | 10.83 | 1.95 | 48.18 | 15.30 | 28.39 | 3.70 | 48.38 | 4:21.30 | 7105 | |
| 3rd place, bronze medalist(s) | Morne van As | South Africa | 11.04 | 6.59w | 11.94 | 1.89 | 49.69 | 15.25 | 36.15 | 4.20 | 49.86 | 4:40.70 | 7050 | |
| 4 | Dhiae Chérif Boudoumi | Algeria | 10.97 | 7.67w | 11.39 | 1.98 | 47.10 | 15.25 | 33.46 | NM | 50.92 | 4:22.80 | 6899 | |
| 5 | Aabobe Tshwanelo | Botswana | 10.97 | 7.11w | 10.47 | 2.10 | 49.77 | 16.23 | 31.71 | 2.60 | 40.28 | 5:08.10 | 6371 | |
| 6 | Fadi Tovagliaro | Comoros | 11.44 | 6.21w | 10.62 | 1.71 | 53.32 | 16.31 | 32.29 | 3.70 | 39.65 | 5:33.20 | 6371 | |
| | Walid Touati | Algeria | DNS | – | – | – | – | – | – | – | – | – | DNS | |
