= List of African under-20 records in athletics =

African Junior Records in the sport of athletics are ratified by the Confederation of African Athletics (CAA). Athletics records comprise the best performance of an athlete before the year of their 20th birthday. Technically, in all under 20 age divisions, the age is calculated "on December 31 of the year of competition" to avoid age group switching during a competitive season. CAA doesn't maintain an official list for indoor performances. All bests shown on the indoor list are tracked by statisticians not officially sanctioned by the governing body.

== Outdoor ==
Key to tables: Awaiting ratification Record not kept by CAA Not ratified or later rescinded by CAA

=== Men ===
Event	Record	Athlete	Nationality	Date	Meet	Place	Age	Ref.
60 m	6.58 A (−1.8 m/s)	Bayanda Walaza	South Africa	8 February 2025	Curro Podium Grand Finale & Simbine Classic Shootout	Pretoria, South Africa	18 years, 365 days	
100 m	9.91 A (+0.8 m/s)	Letsile Tebogo	Botswana	2 August 2022	World U20 Championships	Cali, Colombia	19 years, 56 days	
200 m	19.96 A (−1.0 m/s)	Letsile Tebogo	Botswana	4 August 2022	World U20 Championships	Cali, Colombia	19 years, 58 days	
300 m	31.61	Clarence Munyai	South Africa	28 June 2017	Golden Spike Ostrava	Ostrava, Czech Republic	19 years, 129 days	
400 m	44.22 A	Baboloki Thebe	Botswana	21 May 2016	Botswana Championships	Gaborone, Botswana	19 years, 64 days	
600 m	1:14.79	Mohamed Ali Gouaned	Algeria	26 March 2021	Algeria Winter Championships "Abdelkader Hammani"	Algiers, Algeria	18 years, 264 days	
800 m	1:41.73	Nigel Amos	Botswana	9 August 2012	Olympic Games	London, United Kingdom	18 years, 147 days	
1000 m	2:13.93	Abubaker Kaki	Sudan	22 July 2008	DN Galan	Stockholm, Sweden	19 years, 31 days	
1500 m	3:27.72	Phanuel Koech	Kenya	20 June 2025	Meeting de Paris	Paris, France	18 years, 201 days	
Mile	3:48.06	Reynold Cheruiyot	Kenya	16 September 2023	Prefontaine Classic	Eugene, United States	19 years, 48 days	
Mile (road)	3:54.89	Leonard Kipkemoi Bett	Kenya	8 December 2018	Honolulu Kalakaua Merrie Mile	Honolulu, United States	18 years, 35 days	
2000 m	4:56.86	Isaac Kiprono Songok	Kenya	31 August 2001	ISTAF Berlin	Berlin, Germany	17 years, 128 days	
2000 m	4:56.25	Tesfaye Cheru	Ethiopia	5 July 2011	Pro Athlé Tour; Meeting de Reims Champagne-Ardenne	Reims, France		
3000 m	7:28.19	Yomif Kejelcha	Ethiopia	27 August 2016	Meeting Areva	Saint-Denis, France	19 years, 26 days	
Two miles	8:08.69	Selemon Barega	Ethiopia	30 June 2019	Diamond League	Palo Alto, United States	19 years, 161 days	
5000 m	12:43.02	Selemon Barega	Ethiopia	31 August 2018	Memorial Van Damme	Brussels, Belgium	18 years, 223 days	
5 km (road)	13:00	Sammy Kipketer	Kenya	26 March 2000	Carlsbad 5000	Carlsbad, United States	18 years, 179 days	
5 km (road)	13:00	Saymon Amanuel	Eritrea	19 September 2026	World Road Running Championships	Copenhagen, Denmark	19 years, 115 days	
10,000 m	26:41.75	Samuel Wanjiru	Kenya	26 August 2005	Memorial Van Damme	Brussels, Belgium	18 years, 289 days	
10,000 m	26:37.93	Biniam Mehary	Ethiopia	14 June 2024	Ethiopian 10,000m Olympic Trials	Nerja, Spain	17 years, 177 days	
10 km (road)	26:54	Khairi Bejiga	Ethiopia	5 October 2025	tRUNsylvania International 10K Brasov	Brașov, Romania	19 years, 161 days	
10 km (road)	26:46 X	Rhonex Kipruto	Kenya	8 September 2018	Prague Grand Prix	Prague, Czech Republic	18 years, 331 days	
15 km (road)	42:00	Mathew Kimeli	Kenya	1 May 2017	15 km du Puy-en-Velay	Le Puy-en-Velay, France	19 years, 30 days	
10 miles (road)	44:51	Martin Irungu Mathathi	Kenya	12 December 2004	Kosa 10-Miler	Kōsa, Japan	18 years, 353 days	
20 km (road)	56:18+	Samuel Wanjiru	Kenya	11 September 2005	Rotterdam Half Marathon	Rotterdam, Netherlands	18 years, 305 days	
Half marathon	59:16	Samuel Wanjiru	Kenya	11 September 2005	Rotterdam Half Marathon	Rotterdam, Netherlands	18 years, 305 days	
25 km (road)	1:14:19+	Bazu Worku	Ethiopia	5 April 2009	Paris Marathon	Paris, France	18 years, 202 days	
25 km (road)	1:13:21+	Tsegaye Mekonnen	Ethiopia	24 January 2014	Dubai Marathon	Dubai, United Arab Emirates	18 years, 223 days	
30 km (road)	1:29:25+	Bazu Worku	Ethiopia	5 April 2009	Paris Marathon	Paris, France	18 years, 202 days	
Marathon	2:06:15	Bazu Worku	Ethiopia	5 April 2009	Paris Marathon	Paris, France	18 years, 202 days	
110 m hurdles (99 cm)	13.38 (+0.5 m/s)	Wellington Zaza	Liberia	24 July 2014	World Junior Championships	Eugene, United States	18 years, 251 days	
110 m hurdles (106.7 cm)	13.53 (−0.2 m/s)	William Erese	Nigeria	15 June 1995		Lagos, Nigeria	18 years, 276 days	
400 m hurdles	48.76 A	Llewellyn Herbert	South Africa	8 April 1996		Pretoria, South Africa	18 years, 262 days	
400 m hurdles	48.73	Sokwakhana Zazini	South Africa	11 July 2019	Universiade	Naples, Italy	19 years, 169 days	
2000 m steeplechase	5:19.99	Meresa Kahsay	Ethiopia	12 July 2013	World Youth Championships	Donetsk, Ukraine	17 years, 50 days	
3000 m steeplechase	7:58.66	Stephen Cherono	Kenya	24 August 2001	Memorial Van Damme	Brussels, Belgium	18 years, 313 days	
High jump	2.31 m	Jacques Freitag	South Africa	4 June 2001		Rehlingen, Germany	18 years, 358 days	
Pole vault	5.46 m	Okkert Brits	South Africa	16 December 1992		Paarl, South Africa	19 years, 116 days	
Pole vault	5.50 m	Cheyne Rahme	South Africa	10 April 2010	South African Junior Championships	Germiston, South Africa	19 years, 77 days	
Long jump	8.19 m (+1.5 m/s)	Luvo Manyonga	South Africa	9 July 2010		Bottrop, Germany	19 years, 182 days	
Triple jump	16.96 m (+1.7 m/s)	Godfrey Khotso Mokoena	South Africa	3 April 2004		Bloemfontein, South Africa	19 years, 28 days	
Shot put (6 kg)	21.79 m	Ahmed Hassan	Egypt	23 April 2014		Cairo, Egypt	18 years, 128 days	
Shot put (6 kg)	22.07 m	Kyle Blignaut	South Africa	10 July 2018	World U20 Championships	Tampere, Finland	18 years, 243 days	
Shot put (7.26 kg)	20.39 m	Janus Robberts	South Africa	7 March 1998		Germiston, South Africa	18 years, 362 days	
Discus throw (1.75 kg)	65.68 m	Omar Ahmed El Ghazaly	Egypt	7 November 2003		Cairo, Egypt	19 years, 271 days	
Discus throw (2 kg)								
Hammer throw (6 kg)	81.04 m	Werner Smit	South Africa	29 March 2003		Bellville	18 years, 196 days	
Hammer throw (7.26 kg)								
Javelin throw	80.03 m	Lohan Rautenbach	South Africa	16 April 2005		Durban, South Africa	19 years, 69 days	
Javelin throw	83.07 m	John Robert Oosthuizen	South Africa	19 August 2006	World Junior Championships	Beijing, China	19 years, 208 days	
Javelin throw	80.59 m	Johan Grobler	South Africa	23 July 2016	World U20 Championships	Bydgoszcz, Poland	18 years, 352 days	
Decathlon (6-kg shot, 1.75-kg discus, 99-cm hurdles)	7791 pts	Fredriech Pretorius	South Africa	12 April 2014	South African Junior Combined Events Championships	Pretoria, South Africa	18 years, 251 days	
Decathlon (6-kg shot, 1.75-kg discus, 99-cm hurdles)	100m (wind) / Long jump (wind) / Shot put / High jump / 400m / 110m H (wind) / Discus / Pole vault / Javelin / 1500m; 11.26 (−0.3 m/s) / 7.25 m (±0.0 m/s) / 13.33 m / 1.96 m / 49.72 / 13.96 (+1.0 m/s) / 43.34 m / 4.40 m / 55.02 m / 4:33.14							
Decathlon (Senior implements)	7548 pts	Hamdi Dhouibi	Tunisia	21 July 2001	Francophone Games	Ottawa, Canada	19 years, 178 days	
Decathlon (Senior implements)	100m (wind) / Long jump (wind) / Shot put / High jump / 400m / 110m H (wind) / Discus / Pole vault / Javelin / 1500m; 11.02 (+0.5 m/s) / 7.36 m (−0.7 m/s) / 11.91 m / 1.86 m / 49.61 / 14.98 (+0.3 m/s) / 39.17 m / 4.90 m / 50.13 m / 4:35.66							
Decathlon (Senior implements)	7639 pts	Fredriech Pretorius	South Africa	29 July 2014	Commonwealth Games	Glasgow, United Kingdom	18 years, 359 days	
Decathlon (Senior implements)	100m (wind) / Long jump (wind) / Shot put / High jump / 400m / 110m H (wind) / Discus / Pole vault / Javelin / 1500m; 11.29 (+1.1 m/s) / 7.13 m (+1.8 m/s) / 11.86 m / 1.90 m / 49.31 / 14.62 (+0.5 m/s) / 40.61 m / 4.60 m / 58.76 m / 4:28.33							
Decathlon (Senior implements)	7572 pts	Fredriech Pretorius	South Africa	27 April 2014	7th African Combined Events Meet	Bambous, Mauritius	18 years, 266 days	
Decathlon (Senior implements)	100m (wind) / Long jump (wind) / Shot put / High jump / 400m / 110m H (wind) / Discus / Pole vault / Javelin / 1500m; 11.16 (±0.0 m/s) / 7.08 m (±0.0 m/s) / 12.35 m / 1.95 m / 49.60 / 14.48 (−0.2 m/s) / 40.24 m / 4.60 m / 53.80 m / 4:40.41							
10,000 m walk (track)	42:06.0	Hatem Ghoula	Tunisia	1 May 1992		Tunis, Tunisia	18 years, 329 days	
10,000 m walk (track)	40:38.0 h	Dominic Samson Ndigiti	Kenya	20 August 2019	Kenyan Championships	Nairobi, Kenya	19 years, 140 days	
10,000 m walk (track)	40:55.96	Yohanis Algaw	Ethiopia	23 July 2016	World U20 Championships	Bydgoszcz, Poland	16 years, 344 days	
10 km walk (road)	40:56	Yohanis Algaw	Ethiopia	5 May 2018	IAAF World Race Walking Team Championships	Taicang, China	18 years, 264 days	
20,000 m walk (track)								
20 km walk (road)								
50 km walk (road)								
4 × 100 m relay	38.51 A	Mihlali Xhotyeni; Sinesipho Dambile; Letlhogonolo Moleyane; Benjamin Richardson	South Africa	22 August 2021	World U20 Championships	Nairobi, Kenya		
4 × 400 m relay	3:02.81	Omphemetse Poo; Baboloki Thebe; Karabo Sibanda; Xholani Talane	Botswana	22 July 2016	World U20 Championships	Bydgoszcz, Poland	19 years, 128 days 18 years, 22 days	
4 × 400 m relay	3:02.76	Ryno Riekert; Kryn Romijn; Abelines Schoeman; Leendert Koekemoer	South Africa	9 August 2026	World U20 Championships	Eugene, United States	19 years, 78 days 19 years, 174 days 19 years, 154 days 19 years, 86 days	

=== Women ===
Event	Record	Athlete	Nationality	Date	Meet	Place	Age	Ref.	Video
100 m	10.97 A (+1.6 m/s) (Note: by World Athletics source; -1.1 m/s by CAA source)	Christine Mboma	Namibia	30 April 2022	Gaborone International Meet	Gaborone, Botswana	18 years, 343 days		
200 m	21.78 (+0.6 m/s)	Christine Mboma	Namibia	9 September 2021	Weltklasse Zürich	Zürich, Switzerland	18 years, 110 days		
300 m	36.25	Fatima Yusuf	Nigeria	23 September 1990		Siderno, Italy	19 years, 144 days		
400 m	50.59	Fatima Yusuf	Nigeria	5 August 1990		Budapest, Hungary	19 years, 95 days		
400 m	49.24 A	Christine Mboma	Namibia	11 April 2021		Lusaka, Zambia	17 years, 324 days		
400 m	49.22 A	Christine Mboma	Namibia	17 April 2021	Namibian Championships	Windhoek, Namibia	17 years, 330 days		
400 m	48.54	Christine Mboma	Namibia	30 June 2021	Irena Szewińska Memorial	Bydgoszcz, Poland	18 years, 39 days		
800 m	1:54.01	Pamela Jelimo	Kenya	29 August 2008	Weltklasse Zürich	Zürich, Switzerland	18 years, 268 days		
1000 m	2:37.47	Shura Hotesa	Ethiopia	12 July 1996		Bellinzona, Switzerland	19 years, 193 days		
1500 m	3:57.72	Saron Berhe	Ethiopia	5 July 2025	Prefontaine Classic	Eugene, United States	17 years, 317 days		
1500 m	3:56.98	Faith Kipyegon	Kenya	10 May 2013	Qatar Athletic Super Grand Prix	Doha, Qatar	19 years, 120 days		
Mile	4:24.29	Ksanet Alem	Ethiopia	6 June 2023	Irena Szewińska Memorial	Bydgoszcz, Poland	18 years, 344 days		
Mile (road)	4:22.54 Wo	Mirriam Cherop	Kenya	8 December 2018	Honolulu Kalakaua Merrie Mile	Honolulu, United States	19 years, 166 days		
2000 m	5:34.27	Senbere Teferi	Ethiopia	17 June 2014	Golden Spike Ostrava	Ostrava, Czech Republic	19 years, 45 days		
3000 m	8:30.99	Aynadis Mebratu	Ethiopia	2 September 2023	Xiamen Diamond League	Xiamen, China	18 years, 281 days		
3000 m	8:29.09	Marta Alemayo	Ethiopia	18 July 2026	London Athletics Meet	London, United Kingdom	18 years, 101 days		
Two miles	9:20.81	Alemitu Heroye	Ethiopia	24 August 2014	Birmingham British Athletics Grand Prix	Birmingham, United Kingdom	19 years, 107 days		
5000 m	14:30.88	Tirunesh Dibaba	Ethiopia	11 June 2004		Bergen, Norway	18 years, 254 days		
5000 m	14:27.33	Aleshign Baweke	Ethiopia	6 June 2025	Golden Gala	Rome, Italy	19 years, 134 days		
5 km (road)	14:15 Mx	Marta Alemayo	Ethiopia	4 April 2026	Urban Trail de Lille	Lille, France	17 years, 361 days		
10,000 m	30:26.50	Linet Masai	Kenya	15 August 2008	Olympic Games	Beijing, China	18 years, 254 days		
10 km (road)	30:21 Wo	Yenenesh Shimeket	Ethiopia	4 October 2026	tRUNsylvania International 10K Brasov	Brașov, Romania	19 years, 237 days		
10 km (road)	30:19 a (Note: mark was unratified because the course has a 5.5m/km elevation drop, compared to the maximum permitted drop for record eligibility purposes, 1m/km)	Priscah Chesang	Uganda	31 December 2022	San Silvestre Vallecana	Madrid, Spain	19 years, 146 days		
15 km (road)	47:15+	Degitu Azimeraw	Ethiopia	9 February 2018	Ras Al Khaimah Half Marathon	Ras Al Khaimah, United Arab Emirates	19 years, 16 days		
15 km (road)	47:15+	Wudinesh Alemu	Ethiopia	18 October 2026	Vedanta Delhi Half Marathon	New Delhi, India	19 years, 268 days		
10 miles (road)	51:40	Rose Cheruiyot	Kenya	9 April 1995	Cherry Blossom Ten Mile Run	Washington, United States	18 years, 262 days		
20 km (road)	1:03:09+	Wudinesh Alemu	Ethiopia	18 October 2026	Vedanta Delhi Half Marathon	New Delhi, India	19 years, 268 days		
Half marathon	1:06:35	Wudinesh Alemu	Ethiopia	18 October 2026	Vedanta Delhi Half Marathon	New Delhi, India	19 years, 268 days		
Marathon	2:20:59	Shure Demise	Ethiopia	23 January 2015	Dubai Marathon	Dubai, United Arab Emirates	19 years, 2 days		
100 m hurdles	12.83 A (+0.4 m/s) (Note: ratified despite the lack of doping control)	Oluwatobiloba Amusan	Nigeria	30 April 2016	UTEP Invitational	El Paso, United States	19 years, 7 days		
200 m hurdles (straight)	26.16 (+0.3 m/s)	Zeney van der Walt	South Africa	16 June 2019	Adidas Boost Boston Games	Boston, United States	19 years, 25 days		
300 m hurldes	43.18 A	Lenka du Toit	South Africa	8 February 2025	Curro Podium Grand Finale & Simbine Classic Shootout	Pretoria, South Africa	13 years, 346 days		
400 m hurdles	56.09	Ajoke Adomosu	Nigeria	9 June 2006		Sacramento, United States	18 years, 225 days		
400 m hurdles	55.73	Zenéy van der Walt	South Africa	10 July 2019	Universiade	Naples, Italy	19 years, 49 days		
400 m hurdles	55.05	Zenéy van der Walt	South Africa	17 March 2018	South African Championships	Pretoria, South Africa	17 years, 299 days		
400 m hurdles	55.34	Zenéy van der Walt	South Africa	13 July 2018	World U20 Championships	Tampere, Finland	18 years, 52 days		
400 m hurdles	55.42	Zenéy van der Walt	South Africa	3 July 2018	Meeting Arcobaleno	Celle Ligure, Italy	18 years, 42 days		
Mile steeplechase	5:06.53	Wosane Asefa	Ethiopia	22 August 2025	Memorial Van Damme	Brussels, Belgium	18 years, 231 days		
2000 m steeplechase	6:07.01	Fancy Cherono	Kenya	1 September 2019	ISTAF Berlin	Berlin, Germany	18 years, 30 days		
3000 m steeplechase	8:58.78	Celliphine Chepteek Chespol	Kenya	26 May 2017	Prefontaine Classic	Eugene, United States	18 years, 338 days		
High jump	1.94 m	Hestrie Cloete	South Africa	22 July 1997		Tatra, Poland	18 years, 350 days		
High jump	1.96 m	Charmaine Weavers	South Africa	4 April 1981		Bloemfontein, South Africa	17 years, 36 days		
Pole vault	4.50 m	Ansume de Beer	South Africa	30 June 2026	Fribourg International Meeting	Fribourg, Switzerland	19 years, 6 days		
Long jump	6.61 m	Ese Brume	Nigeria	1 July 2015		Akure, Nigeria	19 years, 162 days		
Long jump	6.68 m	Ese Brume	Nigeria	22 June 2014	Nigerian Championships	Calabar, Nigeria	18 years, 153 days		
Triple jump	14.13 m (+2.0 m/s)	Blessing Okagbare	Nigeria	19 May 2007		Lagos, Nigeria	18 years, 222 days		
Shot put	16.95 m (Note: outdoor best; indoor mark ratified as absolute record)	Simoné du Toit	South Africa	15 June 2006	World Junior Championships	Beijing, China	18 years, 78 days		
Shot put	17.40 m A	Miné de Klerk	South Africa	21 August 2021	World U20 Championships	Nairobi, Kenya	18 years, 144 days		
Discus throw	53.07 m	Simoné du Toit	South Africa	3 February 2006		Roodepoort, South Africa	17 years, 311 days		
Discus throw	53.50 m A	Miné de Klerk	South Africa	20 August 2021	World U20 Championships	Nairobi, Kenya	18 years, 143 days		
Hammer throw	61.01 m	Rana Taha Ibrahim	Egypt	20 March 2009		Maadi, Egypt	16 years, 254 days		
Hammer throw	61.06 m	Kenza-Gwendolyne Falana	Gabon	24 May 2026	22nd International Sparkassen Hammer Throw Meeting	Fränkisch-Crumbach, Germany	19 years, 87 days		
Javelin throw	60.97 m	Aseel Osama Abdel Hamid	Egypt	16 May 2026	African Championships	Accra, Ghana	18 years, 29 days		
Heptathlon	5868 pts	Justine Robbeson	South Africa	17 July 2004	World Junior Championships	Grosseto, Italy	19 years, 63 days		
Heptathlon	100m H (wind) / High jump / Shot put / 200m (wind) / Long jump (wind) / Javelin / 800m; 13.56 (+1.7 m/s) / 1.62 m / 13.02 m / 25.12 / 6.14 m (+0.8 m/s) / 54.16 m / 2:35.20								
5000 m walk (track)	21:49.27	Chahinez Nasri	Tunisia	8 June 2016		Blois, France	20 years, 5 days		
5 km walk (road)	23:01+	Chahinez Nasri	Tunisia	4 May 2014	IAAF World Race Walking Cup	Taicang, China	17 years, 335 days		
10,000 m walk (track)	45:33.69	Yehualeye Beletew	Ethiopia	19 July 2016	World U20 Championships	Bydgoszcz, Poland	17 years, 354 days		
10 km walk (road)	46:43	Chahinez Nasri	Tunisia	4 May 2014	IAAF World Race Walking Cup	Taicang, China	17 years, 335 days		
20,000 m walk (track)									
20 km walk (road)	1:31:58	Yehualeye Beletew	Ethiopia	26 June 2016	African Championships	Durban, South Africa	17 years, 331 days		
4 × 100 m relay	43.44	Beatrice Utondu; Tina Iheagwam; Mary Onyali; Falilat Ogunkoya	Nigeria	9 August 1987		Nairobi, Kenya	17 years, 259 days 19 years, 128 days 19 years, 187 days 18 years, 247 days		
4 × 400 m relay	3:30.84	Folashade Abugan; Muizat Ajoke Odumosu; Joy Eze; Sekinat Adesanya	Nigeria	20 August 2006	World Junior Championships	Beijing, China	15 years, 246 days 18 years, 287 days 18 years, 119 days 19 years, 16 days		

=== Mixed ===
Event	Record	Athlete	Nation	Date	Meet	Place	Age	Ref.
4 × 100 m relay	41.91	Tejiri Godwin; Chigozie Rosemary Nwankwo; Perfect Faye; Oluebube Ezechukwu	Nigeria	6 August 2026	World U20 Championships	Eugene, United States	19 years, 9 days 16 years, 318 days 16 years, 41 days 17 years, 361 days	
4 × 400 m relay	3:19.70 A	Johnson Nnamani; Imaobong Nse Uko; Opeyemi Deborah Oke; Bamidele Ajayi	Nigeria	18 August 2021	2021 Championships	Nairobi, Kenya	17 years, 179 days	

== Indoor ==
=== Men ===
Event	Record	Athlete	Nationality	Date	Meet	Place	Age	Ref.	Video
50 m									
60 m	6.51	Israel Okon Sunday	Nigeria	28 February 2025	SEC Championships	College Station, United States	18 years, 109 days		
200 m	20.57	Francis Obikwelu	Nigeria	23 February 1997	BUPA Indoor Grand Prix	Birmingham, United Kingdom	18 years, 93 days		
400 m	46.32	Moitalel Mpoke Naadokila	Kenya	24 January 2020	Red Raider Invitational	Lubbock, United States	18 years, 350 days		
600 y	1:06.93	Moitalel Naadokila	Kenya	15 February 2020		Lubbock, United States	19 years, 7 days		
600 m	1:15.60	Mohammed Aman	Ethiopia	3 February 2013	Russian Winter Meeting	Moscow, Russia	19 years, 24 days		
800 m	1:44.81	Abubaker Kaki	Sudan	9 March 2008	World Championships	Valencia, Spain	18 years, 262 days		
1000 m	2:15.77	Abubaker Kaki	Sudan	21 February 2008		Stockholm, Sweden	18 years, 245 days		
1500 m	3:34.83	Biniam Mehary	Ethiopia	6 February 2024	Copernicus Cup	Toruń, Poland	17 years, 48 days		
Mile	3:55.96	Yohannes Asmare	Ethiopia	26 January 2024	BU John Thomas Terrier Classic	Boston, United States	17 years, 303 days		
2000 m	4:57.74	Yomif Kejelcha	Ethiopia	28 February 2014	Meeting National	Metz, France	16 years, 211 days		
3000 m	7:29.99	Biniam Mehary	Ethiopia	13 February 2025	Meeting Hauts-de-France Pas-de-Calais	Liévin, France	18 years, 55 days		
Two miles	8:13.32	Tariku Bekele	Ethiopia	18 February 2006	Norwich Union Indoor Grand Prix	Birmingham, United Kingdom	18 years, 355 days		
5000 m	12:53.29	Isiah Koech	Kenya	11 February 2011	PSD Bank Meeting	Düsseldorf, Germany	17 years, 54 days		
50 m hurdles									
60 m hurdles									
60 m hurdles (99 cm)	7.94	Nathan Nsakala	Democratic Republic of the Congo	26 January 2019	Meeting Elite en salle de Nantes	Nantes, France	18 years, 276 days		
400 m hurdles	50.41 OT	Wouter Le Roux	South Africa	9 February 2005	Botnia Games	Korsholm, Finland	19 years, 23 days		
High jump	2.28 m	Younes Ayachi	Algeria	6 February 2026	BKK Freundenburg High Jump Meeting	Weinheim, Germany	17 years, 300 days		
Pole vault	5.30 m	Kyle Rademeyer	South Africa	15 January 2021	UAB Blazer Invitational	Birmingham, United States	18 years, 352 days		
Long jump	7.90 m	Fabian Edoki	Nigeria	20 February 2016	South Plains College Indoor Invite	Levelland, United States	17 years, 327 days		
Triple jump									
Shot put (6 kg)									
Shot put									
Heptathlon (Junior)									
Heptathlon (Junior)	60m / Long jump / Shot put / High jump / 60m H / Pole vault / 1000m								
Heptathlon (Senior)									
Heptathlon (Senior)	60m / Long jump / Shot put / High jump / 60m H / Pole vault / 1000m								
5000 m walk (track)									
4 × 200 m relay									
4 × 400 m relay									
4 × 800 m relay									

=== Women ===
Event	Record	Athlete	Nationality	Date	Meet	Place	Age	Ref.
50 m								
60 m	7.09	Joan Uduak Ekah	Nigeria	7 March 1999	World Championships	Maebashi, Japan	18 years, 81 days	
200 m	22.75	Favour Ofili	Nigeria	27 February 2021	SEC Championships	Fayetteville, United States	18 years, 58 days	
400 m	52.94	Kudirat Akhigbe	Nigeria	2 February 2000		Valencia, Spain	18 years, 35 days	
800 m	2:01.03	Meskerem Legesse	Ethiopia	14 February 2004		Fayetteville, United States	17 years, 139 days	
1000 m	2:40.51	Tizita Bogale	Ethiopia	16 February 2012	Meeting féminin du Val d'Oise	Eaubonne, France	18 years, 218 days	
1500 m	4:01.23	Saron Berhe	Ethiopia	3 February 2026	Czech Indoor Gala	Ostrava, Czech Republic	18 years, 165 days	
Mile	4:24.10	Kalkidan Gezahegne	Ethiopia	20 February 2010	Aviva Indoor Grand Prix	Birmingham, United Kingdom	18 years, 288 days	
2000 m	5:35.46	Dawit Seyaum	Ethiopia	7 February 2015	New Balance Indoor Grand Prix	Boston, United States	18 years, 195 days	
3000 m	8:33.56	Tirunesh Dibaba	Ethiopia	20 February 2004	Aviva Indoor Grand Prix	Birmingham, United Kingdom	18 years, 142 days	
3000 m	8:32.49	Senayet Getachew	Ethiopia	4 February 2024	New Balance Grand Prix	Boston, United States	18 years, 126 days	
Two miles	9:34.03	Meseret Defar	Ethiopia	27 January 2002	Adidas Indoor Games	Boston, United States	18 years, 69 days	
5000 m	14:42.94	Senayet Getachew	Ethiopia	27 January 2024	BU John Thomas Terrier Classic	Boston, United States	18 years, 118 days	
50 m hurdles (84 cm)								
60 m hurdles	8.38	Cynthia Bolingo	Democratic Republic of the Congo	29 January 2011		Ghent, Belgium	18 years, 17 days	
High jump								
Pole vault	4.11 m	Sydney Rothman	South Africa	14 February 2007	14e AV PEC 1910 Indoor	Apeldoorn, Netherlands	16 years, 266 days	
Long jump								
Triple jump	13.36 m (Note: 3rd and 5th jumps in series.)	Tessy Ebosele	Nigeria	16 February 2019	Spanish Championships	Antequera, Spain	16 years, 203 days	
Shot put	18.50 m	Jessica Oji	Nigeria	1 March 2026	Ivy League Championships	New York City, United States	19 years, 62 days	
Pentathlon								
Pentathlon	60m H / High jump / Shot put / Long jump / 800m							
3000 m walk (track)								
5000 m walk (track)								
4 × 400 m relay								
4 × 800 m relay								
