= Ashley Erasmus =

South African athlete (born 2005)

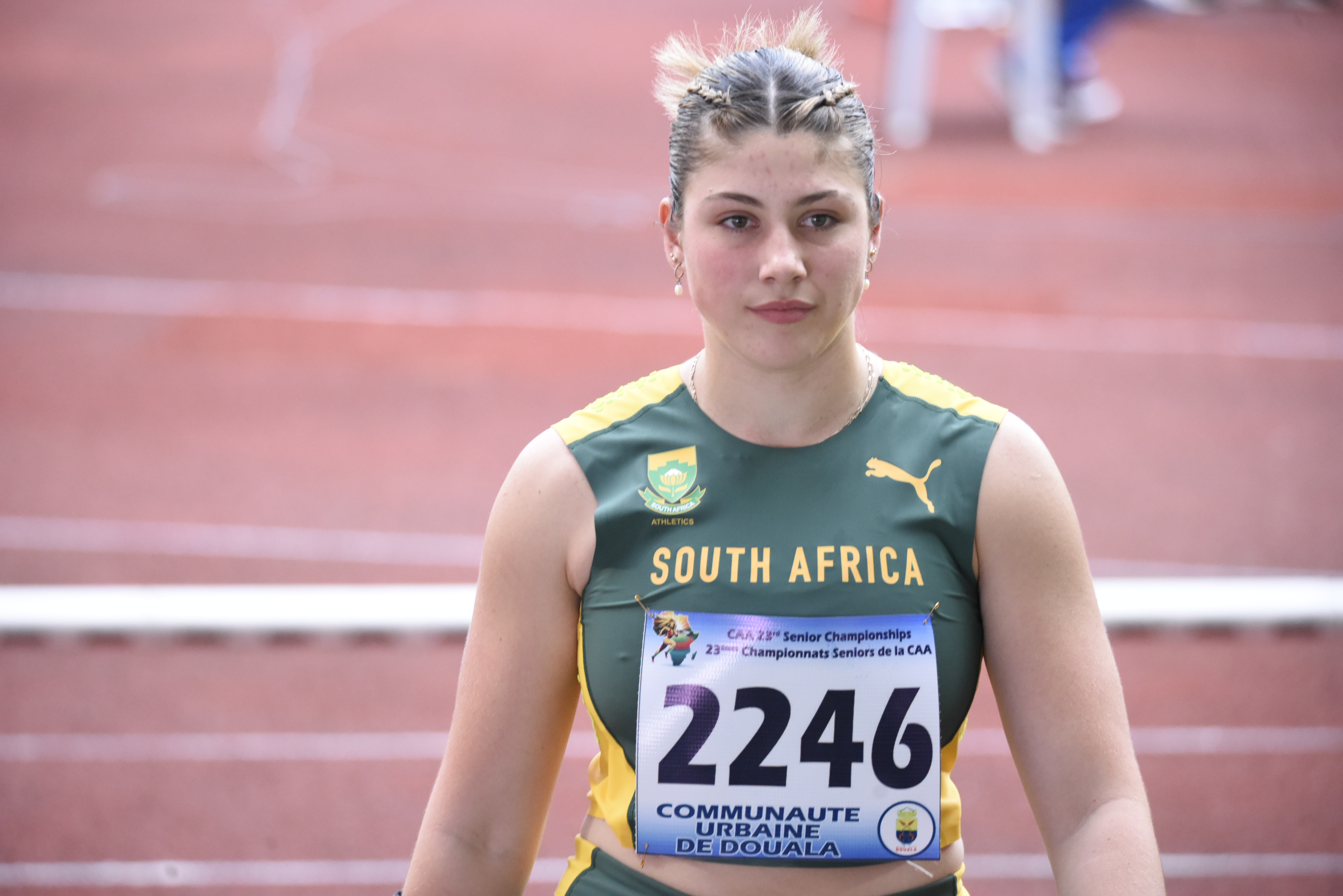
- Erasmus in 2024

Personal information
- Nationality: South African
- Born: 7 June 2005 (age 21)

Sport
- Sport: Athletics
- Events: Shot put, Discus

Achievements and titles
- Personal bests: Shot put: 18.30m (Fayetteville, 2026); Discus: 53.92m (College Station, 2025)
Medal record
Women's athletics
Representing South Africa
African Games
Gold medal – first place	2023 Accra	Shot put
African Championships
Gold medal – first place	2024 Douala	Shot put
African U20 Championships
Gold medal – first place	2023 Ndola	Shot put
Gold medal – first place	2023 Ndola	Discus

Ashley Erasmus (born 7 June 2005) is a South African track and field athlete who won gold at the 2023 African Games and the 2024 African Championships in Athletics in the shot put.

== Early life ==
From Mpumalanga she was educated at Hoërskool Nelspruit. She received a scholarship to attend University of Southern California.

== Career ==
A member or Mpumalanga Athletics, Erasmus won gold in the shot put and the discus at the South African U18 Track And Field Championships in Potchefstroom. In the shot put competition she threw 18.15 metres (59.5 ft), nearly three metres clear of her nearest opponent, and comfortably clear of the previous South African youth record of 17.52 metres (57.5 ft) which was set by Lezaan Jordaan in Germiston in April 2012. In the discus she produced a personal best of 51.77 metres (169.8 ft).

Erasmus won gold in both the shot put and the discus at the African U20 Championships in Ndola, Zambia in 2023. She became South African senior national champion in the shot put in 2023.

Erasmus won shot put gold at the 2023 African Games in Accra in March 2024 with a personal best of 16.98 metres (55.7 ft). She finished seventh in the discus at the same event with a throw of 51.85 metres (170.1 ft). In April 2024, she won the shot put at the South African national championship in Pietermaritzburg with a 17.27 metres (56.7 ft) distance. She finished third in the discus at the same event. She won the gold medal in the shot put at the 2024 African Championships in Athletics in Douala, Cameroon in June 2024.

In September 2025, she competed at the 2025 World Championships in Tokyo, Japan.

Erasmus qualified for the 2026 NCAA Division I Indoor Track and Field Championships. Competing at the 2026 NCAA Division 1 West Outdoor Regionals in Fayetteville, Arkansas in May, Erasmus improved her personal best to 18.30 m for the shot put. In July, she placed tenth in the shot put at the 2026 Commonwealth Games in Glasgow, Scotland.
