= 2024 African Championships in Athletics – Men's pole vault =

Men's pole vault at the 2024 African Championships in Athletics
- Venue: Japoma Stadium
- Location: Douala, Cameroon
- Dates: 25 June
- Competitors: 6 from 4 nations
- Winning height: 5.20 m

Medalists
gold medal	Kyle Rademeyer	South Africa
silver medal	Boubacar Diallo	Mali
bronze medal	Mehdi Amar Rouana	Algeria

The men's pole vault event at the 2024 African Championships in Athletics was held on 25 June in Douala, Cameroon.

== Records ==
Records before the 2024 African Athletics Championships
Record	Athlete (nation)	Height (m)	Location	Date
World record	Armand Duplantis (SWE)	6.24	Xiamen, China	20 April 2024
African record	Okkert Brits (RSA)	6.03	Cologne, Germany	18 August 1995
Championship record	Cheyne Rahme (RSA)	5.41	Marrakesh, Morocco	13 August 2014
World leading	Armand Duplantis (SWE)	6.24	Xiamen, China	20 April 2024
African leading	Kyle Rademeyer (RSA)	5.65	Monroe, United States	10 May 2024

== Results ==
Rank	Athlete	Nationality	3.90	4.10	4.30	4.50	4.70	4.90	5.10	5.20	5.30	5.40	Result	Notes
1st place, gold medalist(s)	Kyle Rademeyer	South Africa	–	–	–	–	–	–	–	xo	–	xxx	5.20	
2nd place, silver medalist(s)	Boubacar Diallo	Mali	–	–	–	–	xo	o	o	xxx			5.10	
3rd place, bronze medalist(s)	Mehdi Amar Rouana	Algeria	–	–	–	–	–	–	xo	xxx			5.10	
	Valco van Wyk	South Africa	–	–	–	–	–	xxx					NM	
	Miraf Assefa	Ethiopia	xxx										NM	
	Abera Alemu	Ethiopia	xxx										NM	

== See also ==
- Athletics at the 2023 African Games – Men's pole vault
