= 2022 World Athletics U20 Championships – Women's shot put =

Women's shot put at the 2022 World Athletics U20 Championships
- Venue: Estadio Olímpico Pascual Guerrero
- Dates: 1 August (qualification); 2 August (final)
- Competitors: 23 from 18 nations
- Winning distance: 17.17

Medalists
gold medal	Miné de Klerk	South Africa
silver medal	Pınar Akyol	Turkey
bronze medal	Zuzanna Maślana	Poland

The women's shot put at the 2022 World Athletics U20 Championships was held at the Estadio Olímpico Pascual Guerrero on 1 and 2 August.

24 athletes from 18 countries were originally entered to the competition. Since only two athletes per member nation can compete in each event, the third shot putter entered by the United States, Sarah Marvin, was unable to compete reducing the athletes to 23.

== Records ==
U20 standing records prior to the 2022 World Athletics U20 Championships were as follows:

Record	Athlete & Nationality	Mark	Location	Date
World U20 Record	Astrid Kumbernuss (GDR)	20.54	Orimattila, Finland	1 July 1989
Championship Record	Cheng Xiaoyan (CHN)	18.76	Lisbon, Portugal	21 July 1994
World U20 Leading	Miné de Klerk (RSA)	17.19	Eugene, United States	2 April 2022

== Results ==
=== Qualification ===
The qualification round took place on 15 July, in two groups, both starting at 9:40. Athletes attaining a qualifying mark of 15.70 metres ( Q ) or at least the 12 best performers ( q ) advanced to final. The overall results were as follows:

Rank	Group	Name	Nationality	Round			Mark	Notes
Rank	Group	Name	Nationality	1	2	3	Mark	Notes
1	B	Malika Nasreddinova	Uzbekistan	15.06	16.13		16.13	Q, PB
2	A	Miné de Klerk	South Africa	16.11			16.11	Q
3	A	Treneese Hamilton	Dominica	15.89			15.89	Q, NU20R
4	B	Pınar Akyol	Turkey	15.38	15.77		15.77	Q
5	A	Tapenisa Havea	New Zealand	15.04	15.49	15.51	15.51	q
6	B	Zuzanna Maślana	Poland	15.06	14.99	15.51	15.51	q
7	B	Jaqueliné Gippner	Germany	x	15.33	15.09	15.33	q
8	A	Tuane Silver	Namibia	14.22	15.26	13.81	15.26	q
9	B	Zonica Lindeque	South Africa	13.12	15.14	14.26	15.14	q
10	B	Ines Lopez	Spain	15.10	14.17	14.41	15.10	q
11	A	Katrin Brzyszkowská	Czech Republic	14.07	x	14.75	14.75	q
12	B	Cleo Agyepong	Great Britain	14.63	x	14.15	14.63	q
13	A	Britannia Johnson	Jamaica	13.57	14.13	14.44	14.44	
14	B	Amelia Flynt	United States	13.66	14.30	14.41	14.41	
15	B	Natalia Rankin-Chitar	New Zealand	13.80	14.37	x	14.37	
16	A	Chrystal Herpin	United States	13.42	14.25	x	14.25	
17	B	Maria Andreadi	Greece	13.58	14.21	13.84	14.21	
18	A	Anastasia Ntragkomirova	Greece	13.50	13.46	13.60	13.60	
19	B	Mariya Larina	Ukraine	12.74	13.57	x	13.57	
20	A	Nicole Valencia	Colombia	13.12	13.13	12.73	13.13	
21	A	Anna Musci	Italy	13.10	x	11.51	13.10	
22	A	Vineta Krūmiņa	Latvia	12.11	13.09	x	13.09	
23	A	Nina Chioma Ndubuisi	Germany	x	x	12.55	12.55	

=== Final ===
The final was started at 15:16 on 2 August.

Rank	Name	Nationality	Round						Mark	Notes
Rank	Name	Nationality	1	2	3	4	5	6	Mark	Notes
1	Miné de Klerk	South Africa	16.42	16.76	17.17	x	16.70	16.67	17.17	
2	Pınar Akyol	Turkey	x	x	16.76	x	x	16.84	16.84	
3	Zuzanna Maślana	Poland	15.03	16.04	15.70	16.06	15.36	15.86	16.06	PB
4	Tapenisa Havea	New Zealand	15.43	15.18	15.52	15.97	x	x	15.97	=PB
5	Tuane Silver	Namibia	13.38	15.32	15.95	14.57	15.33	15.35	15.95	NU20R
6	Treneese Hamilton	Dominica	15.78	x	14.67	13.60	x	14.29	15.78	
7	Katrin Brzyszkowská	Czech Republic	x	14.85	x	15.06	14.85	15.77	15.77	
8	Malika Nasreddinova	Uzbekistan	15.26	x	15.73	15.52	15.68	x	15.73	
9	Jaqueliné Gippner	Germany	14.79	x	x				14.79	
10	Zonica Lindeque	South Africa	14.72	14.31	14.03				14.72	
11	Cleo Agyepong	Great Britain	14.56	x	13.59				14.56	
12	Inés López	Spain	x	x	13.63				13.63	
