= Malika Nasriddinova =

Uzbek shot putter (born 2004)

Personal information
- Born: 12 February 2004 (age 22)

Sport
- Sport: Athletics
- Event: Shot put

Achievements and titles
- Personal best(s): Shot put: 17.35m (Tashkent, 2024)
Medal record
Women's athletics
Representing Uzbekistan
Asian Indoor Championships
Silver medal – second place	2024 Tehran	Shot put
Asian U20 Championships
Silver medal – second place	2023 Yecheon	Shot put

Malika Nasriddinova (born 12 February 2004) is an Uzbekistani shot putter. She is a multiple time national champion.

== Career ==
She won her first Uzbek national titles, both indoors and outdoors, in 2022. That year, she improved her personal best in the shot put from 15.55m in May 2022 to a 16.13m lifetime best in August 2022 to qualify for the final at the 2022 World Athletics U20 Championships in Cali, Colombia at the age of 18 year-old, before placing eighth in the final.

She won a silver medal at the 2023 Asian U20 Athletics Championships in Yecheon, South Korea with a distance of 15.76 metres in April 2023. She finished in sixth place at the 2023 Asian Athletics Championships in Bangkok in July 2023.

She won the silver medal in the shot put at the 2024 Asian Indoor Athletics Championships in Tehran in February 2024.
