= 2024 African Championships in Athletics – Men's long jump =

Men's long jump at the 2024 African Championships in Athletics
- Venue: Japoma Stadium
- Location: Douala, Cameroon
- Dates: 21 June (qualification); 22 June (final)
- Competitors: 17 from 13 nations
- Winning distance: 7.78 m

Medalists
| gold medal | Cheswill Johnson | South Africa |
| silver medal | Chenoult Coetzee | Namibia |
| bronze medal | Goodness Iredia | Nigeria |

The men's long jump event at the 2024 African Championships in Athletics was held on 21 and 22 June in Douala, Cameroon.

== Records ==
Records before the 2024 African Athletics Championships
| Record | Athlete (nation) | Distance (m) | Location | Date |
|---|---|---|---|---|
| World record | Mike Powell (USA) | 8.95 | Tokyo, Japan | 30 August 1991 |
| African record | Luvo Manyonga (RSA) | 8.65 | Potchefstroom, South Africa | 22 April 2017 |
| Championship record | Rushwal Samaai (RSA) | 8.45 | Asaba, Nigeria | 2 August 2018 |
| World leading | Miltiadis Tentoglou (GRE) | 8.65 | Rome, Italy | 8 June 2024 |
| African leading | Jovan van Vuuren (RSA) | 8.30 | Pretoria, South Africa | 9 March 2024 |

== Results ==
=== Qualification ===
Qualifying performance: ? (Q) or 12 best performers (q) advanced to the final.

| Rank | Group | Athlete | Nationality | #1 | #2 | #3 | Result | Notes |
|---|---|---|---|---|---|---|---|---|
| 1 | A | Cheswill Johnson | South Africa | 7.76 | 7.79 | – | 7.79 | q |
| 2 | A | Emmanuel Njoku | Nigeria | 7.30 | 5.41 | 7.77 | 7.77 | q |
| 3 | B | Goodness Iredia | Nigeria | 7.70 | – | – | 7.70 | q |
| 4 | B | Romeo N'tia | Benin | 7.63 | 7.48 | – | 7.63 | q |
| 5 | B | Komi Bernard Konu | Togo | x | 7.56 | x | 7.56 | q |
| 6 | B | Chenoult Coetzee | Namibia | 7.48 | 7.55 | – | 7.55 | q |
| 7 | A | Tafadzwa Chikomba | Zimbabwe | 7.29 | 7.48 | 7.28 | 7.48 | q |
| 8 | B | Thapelo Monaiwa | Botswana | 7.25 | 7.37 | 7.43 | 7.43 | q |
| 9 | B | Appolinaire Yinra | Cameroon | 7.35 | 7.39 | 7.02 | 7.39 | q |
| 10 | A | Buli Melaku | Ethiopia | 7.25 | 7.38 | 7.14 | 7.38 | q |
| 11 | A | Raymond Nkwemy Tchomfa | Cameroon | 7.24 | 7.30 | 7.37 | 7.37 | q |
| 12 | A | Louai Lamraoui | Algeria | x | x | 7.34 | 7.34 | q |
| 13 | A | Soumaila Sabo | Burkina Faso | 7.21 | 6.99 | 7.01 | 7.21 | |
| 14 | B | Charles Okello | Uganda | 6.97 | 7.19 | x | 7.19 | |
| 15 | A | Birhanu Mosisa | Ethiopia | 6.89 | 6.96 | – | 6.96 | |
| 16 | B | Freddy Kevin Oyono | Cameroon | 6.89 | x | 6.64 | 6.89 | |
| 17 | A | Gregorio Ndong Oye | Equatorial Guinea | 6.45 | x | 6.43 | 6.45 | |
| | A | Edwin Kipmutai Too | Kenya | | | | DNS | |

=== Final ===
| Rank | Athlete | Nationality | #1 | #2 | #3 | #4 | #5 | #6 | Result | Notes |
|---|---|---|---|---|---|---|---|---|---|---|
| 1st place, gold medalist(s) | Cheswill Johnson | South Africa | 7.43 | 7.78 | x | 7.73 | 7.73 | x | 7.78 | |
| 2nd place, silver medalist(s) | Chenoult Coetzee | Namibia | 7.58 | 7.73 | 7.78 | 7.57 | 7.17 | 7.58 | 7.78 | |
| 3rd place, bronze medalist(s) | Goodness Iredia | Nigeria | 7.54 | 7.75 | 7.70 | 7.69 | x | x | 7.75 | |
| 4 | Emmanuel Njoku | Nigeria | 7.37 | 7.72 | 7.53 | 7.41 | 7.61 | x | 7.72 | |
| 5 | Thapelo Monaiwa | Botswana | 7.68 | 7.53 | 7.44 | 7.44 | 7.48 | ? | 7.68 | |
| 6 | Tafadzwa Chikomba | Zimbabwe | 7.41 | 7.34 | 7.51 | 7.59 | 7.40 | 7.53 | 7.59 | |
| 7 | Appolinaire Yinra | Cameroon | 6.90 | 7.06 | 7.52 | 7.57 | x | 7.39 | 7.57 | |
| 8 | Raymond Nkwemy Tchomfa | Cameroon | x | 7.39 | 7.10 | 6.50 | 7.19 | 7.47 | 7.47 | |
| 9 | Buli Melaku | Ethiopia | 7.32 | x | 7.26 | | | | 7.32 | |
| 10 | Romeo N'tia | Benin | 7.14 | 7.29 | x | | | | 7.29 | |
| 11 | Louai Lamraoui | Algeria | 7.29 | x | x | | | | 7.29 | |
| 12 | Komi Bernard Konu | Togo | 7.25 | 6.96 | 7.13 | | | | 7.25 | |

== See also ==
- Athletics at the 2023 African Games – Men's long jump
