= Athletics at the 2023 African Games – Women's shot put =

The women's shot put event at the 2023 African Games was held on 22 March 2024 in Accra, Ghana.

== Medalists ==
Gold	Silver	Bronze
Ashley Erasmus; South Africa	Oyesade Olatoye; Nigeria	Ischke Senekal; South Africa

== Results ==
Held on 22 March

Rank	Name	Nationality	#1	#2	#3	#4	#5	#6	Result	Notes
1st place, gold medalist(s)	Ashley Erasmus	South Africa	16.40	16.92	x	x	16.70	16.98	16.98	
2nd place, silver medalist(s)	Oyesade Olatoye	Nigeria	15.05	16.35	16.47	16.61	16.55	16.48	16.61	
3rd place, bronze medalist(s)	Ischke Senekal	South Africa	15.65	x	15.91	16.38	16.31	15.22	16.38	
4	Collette Uys	South Africa	13.48	14.92	14.42	15.24	15.59	14.76	15.59	
5	Carine Mékam	Gabon	15.28	14.51	15.31	15.24	14.92	15.22	15.31	
6	Nora Monie	Cameroon	x	13.82	15.29	14.41	14.86	14.65	15.29	
7	Zurga Usman	Ethiopia	12.46	12.77	12.94	x	13.92	13.59	13.92	NR
8	Luz Maria Siafa	Equatorial Guinea	13.16	12.77	12.90	12.75	x	13.59	13.59	
9	Nassira Koné	Mali	11.50	12.22	12.58				12.58	
10	Aynalem Negash	Ethiopia	x	11.09	10.96				11.09	
	Mwanaamina Mkwayu	Tanzania							DNS	
	Odile Ahouanwanou	Benin							DNS	
