= Colette Uys =

South African athlete (born 2000)

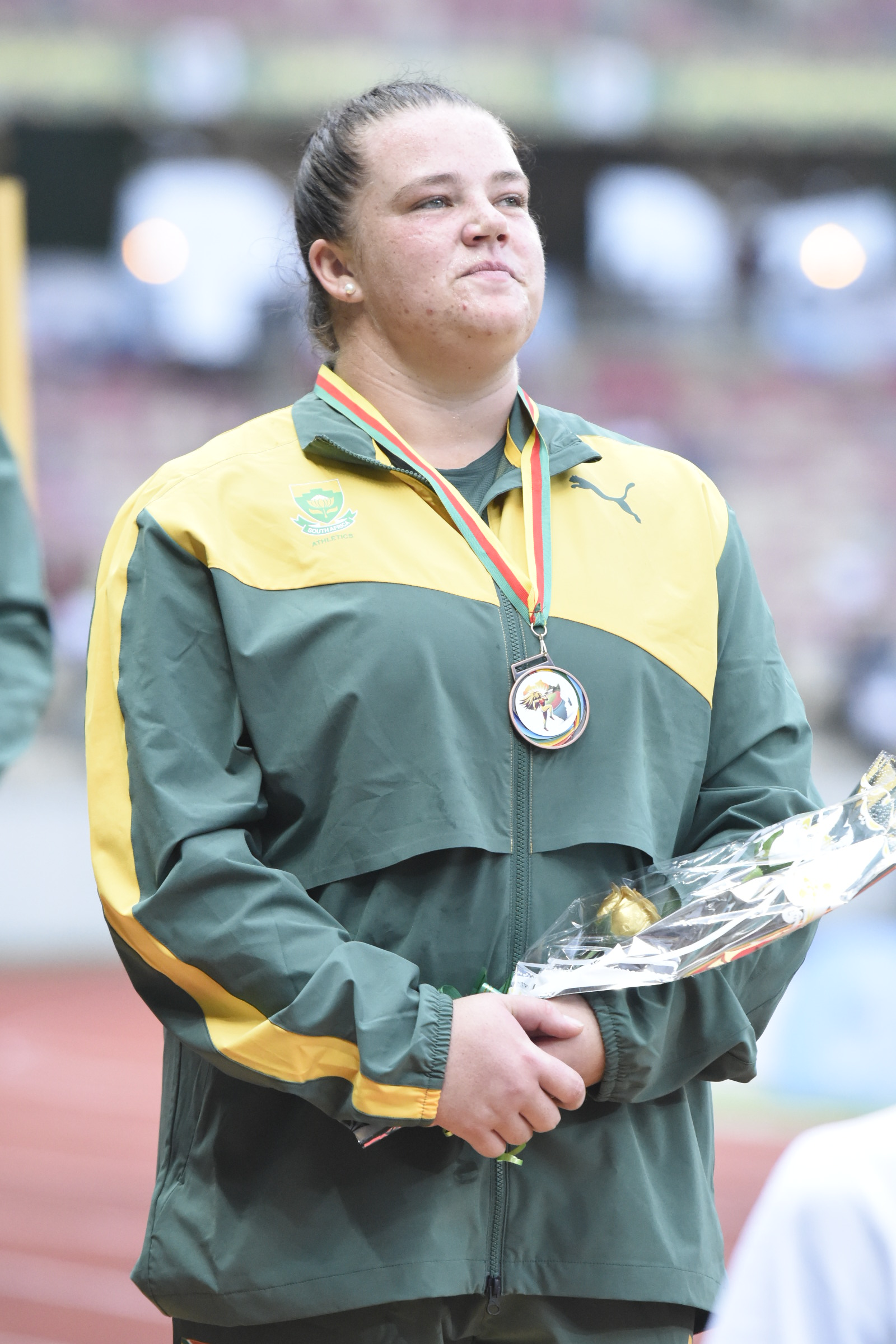
- Uys in 2024

Personal information
- Nationality: South African
- Born: 20 April 2000 (age 26)

Sport
- Sport: Athletics
- Event(s): Shot put, Discus, Hammer

Achievements and titles
- Personal best(s): Shot put: 18.14m (Potchefstroom, 2025); Discus: 57.94m (Potchefstroom, 2025); Hammer throw: 65.84m (Potchefstroom, 2025)
Medal record
Women's athletics
Representing South Africa
African Games
Bronze medal – third place	2024 Douala	Shot put
African Championships
Gold medal – first place	2026 Accra	Shot put
Summer World University Games
Bronze medal – third place	2025 Bochum	Shot put

Colette Uys (born 20 April 2000) is a South African athlete. She has won national titles at the South African Athletics Championships in the Hammer throw, Discus and Shot put.

== Early and personal life ==
She is from Welkom in the Free State. She started throwing shot put and discus when she was in high school, and started the hammer throw in 2020. She studied in the United States at the University of South Alabama before studying medicine at the University of Pretoria.

== Career ==
Coached by Constand van Rooyen, she finished 2023 with a best in the hammer throw of 59.99 metres. In March 2024, she placed fourth in the hammer throw at the delayed 2023 African Games in Accra, Ghana with a throw of 62.35 metres. At the championships, she also placed fourth in the shot put competition.

In April 2024, she won the hammer throw during the South African Athletics Championships in Pietermaritzburg moving to fourth on the South African all-time list with her winning throw of 64.31 metres. At the championships she also won bronze in the shot put with a distance of 16.58 metres. She won the bronze medal in the shot put at the 2024 African Championships in Athletics in Douala, Cameroon in June 2024.

In April 2025, she won both the discus (57.94m) and shot put with 18.14m, three 3 cm away from the national record, and won silver in the hammer throw (65.53m), at the 2025 South African Athletics Championships. The following month, she won in the shot put (17.16 metres), hammer throw (65.32 metres), and discus (55.48 metres) at the University Sport South Africa (USSA) Championship in May 2025. In July 2025, she won the bronze medal in the shot put at the 2025 Summer World University Games in Bochum, Germany. She competed in the shot put at the 2025 World Championships in Tokyo, Japan without advancing to the final.

In April 2026, she won the discus title at the South African championships with a 57.86m throw. She also placed second in the hammer throw at the championships. In May, Uys managed 17.63 metres with the shot put and won the gold medal at the 2026 African Championships in Athletics in Accra, Ghana.
