= 2024 African Championships in Athletics – Women's 20 kilometres walk =

Women's 20 kilometres walk at the 2024 African Championships in Athletics
- Venue: Japoma Stadium
- Location: Douala, Cameroon
- Dates: 25 June
- Competitors: 9 from 5 nations
- Winning time: 1:37:46

Medalists
gold medal	Sintayehu Masire	Ethiopia
silver medal	Souad Azzi	Algeria
bronze medal	Margret Gati Chacha	Kenya

The women's 20 kilometres walk event at the 2024 African Championships in Athletics was held on 25 June in Douala, Cameroon.

== Records ==
Records before the 2024 African Athletics Championships
Record	Athlete (nation)	Time (s)	Location	Date
World record	Yelena Lashmanova (RUS)	1:23:39	Cheboksary, Russia	9 June 2018
African record	Grace Wanjiru (KEN)	1:30:40	Nairobi, Kenya	6 June 2018
Championship record	Grace Wanjiru (KEN)	1:30:43	Durban, South Africa	26 June 2016
World leading	Elvira Chepareva (RUS)	1:24:31	Sochi, Russia	27 February 2024
African leading	Souad Azzi (ALG)	1:37:15	Algiers, Algeria	13 April 2024

== Results ==
Rank	Athlete	Nationality	Time	Notes
1st place, gold medalist(s)	Sintayehu Masire	Ethiopia	1:37:46	
2nd place, silver medalist(s)	Souad Azzi	Algeria	1:40:36	
3rd place, bronze medalist(s)	Margret Gati Chacha	Kenya	1:41:19	
4	Wubalem Shugute	Ethiopia	1:42:41	
5	Marissa Swanepoel	South Africa	1:46:25	
6	Jessica Groenewald	South Africa	1:48:58	
7	Melissa Touloum	Algeria	1:48:58	
8	Hamadou Takio	Cameroon	1:59:49	
	Alem Tafes	Ethiopia	DNF	

== See also ==
- Athletics at the 2023 African Games – Women's 20 kilometres walk
