= 2021 World Athletics U20 Championships – Women's shot put =

Women's shot put at the 2021 World Athletics U20 Championships
- Venue: Kasarani Stadium
- Dates: 21 August
- Competitors: 10 from 8 nations
- Winning distance: 17.40 m

Medalists
gold medal	Miné de Klerk	South Africa
silver medal	Pınar Akyol	Turkey
bronze medal	Dane Roets	South Africa

The women's shot put at the 2021 World Athletics U20 Championships was held at the Kasarani Stadium on 21 August.

== Records ==
Standing records prior to the 2021 World Athletics U20 Championships
World U20 Record	Astrid Kumbernuss (GDR)	20.54	Orimattila, Finland	1 July 1989
Championship Record	Cheng Xiaoyan (CHN)	18.76	Lisbon, Portugal	21 July 1994
World U20 Leading	Pınar Akyol (TUR)	17.65	Split, Croatia	9 May 2021

== Results ==
=== Final ===
The final was held on 21 August at 16:40.

Rank	Name	Nationality	Round						Mark	Notes
Rank	Name	Nationality	1	2	3	4	5	6	Mark	Notes
1st place, gold medalist(s)	Miné de Klerk	South Africa	17.30	17.24	16.77	17.15	x	17.40	17.40	
2nd place, silver medalist(s)	Pınar Akyol	Turkey	16.62	x	16.72	x	16.58	16.68	16.72	
3rd place, bronze medalist(s)	Dane Roets	South Africa	14.90	14.99	14.77	14.97	14.94	15.61	15.61	
4	Darya Shinkevich	Authorised Neutral Athletes	14.95	14.75	14.62	14.82	14.76	15.34	15.34	
5	Katrin Brzyszkowská	Czech Republic	x	14.54	14.34	14.58	x	14.83	14.83	
6	Anastasia Ntragkomirova	Greece	14.47	x	13.93	14.57	14.50	13.78	14.57	
7	Débora Quaresma	Portugal	14.27	14.10	14.11	14.26	14.39	14.53	14.53	
8	Büşra Hatun Ekinci	Turkey	x	x	13.59	x	13.47	14.29	14.29	
9	Treneese Hamilton	Dominica	12.50	13.22	11.95				13.22	NU20R
10	Maureen Milka Akisa	Kenya	x	x	11.34				11.34	
