= Edwin Too =

Kenyan decathlete (born 1995)

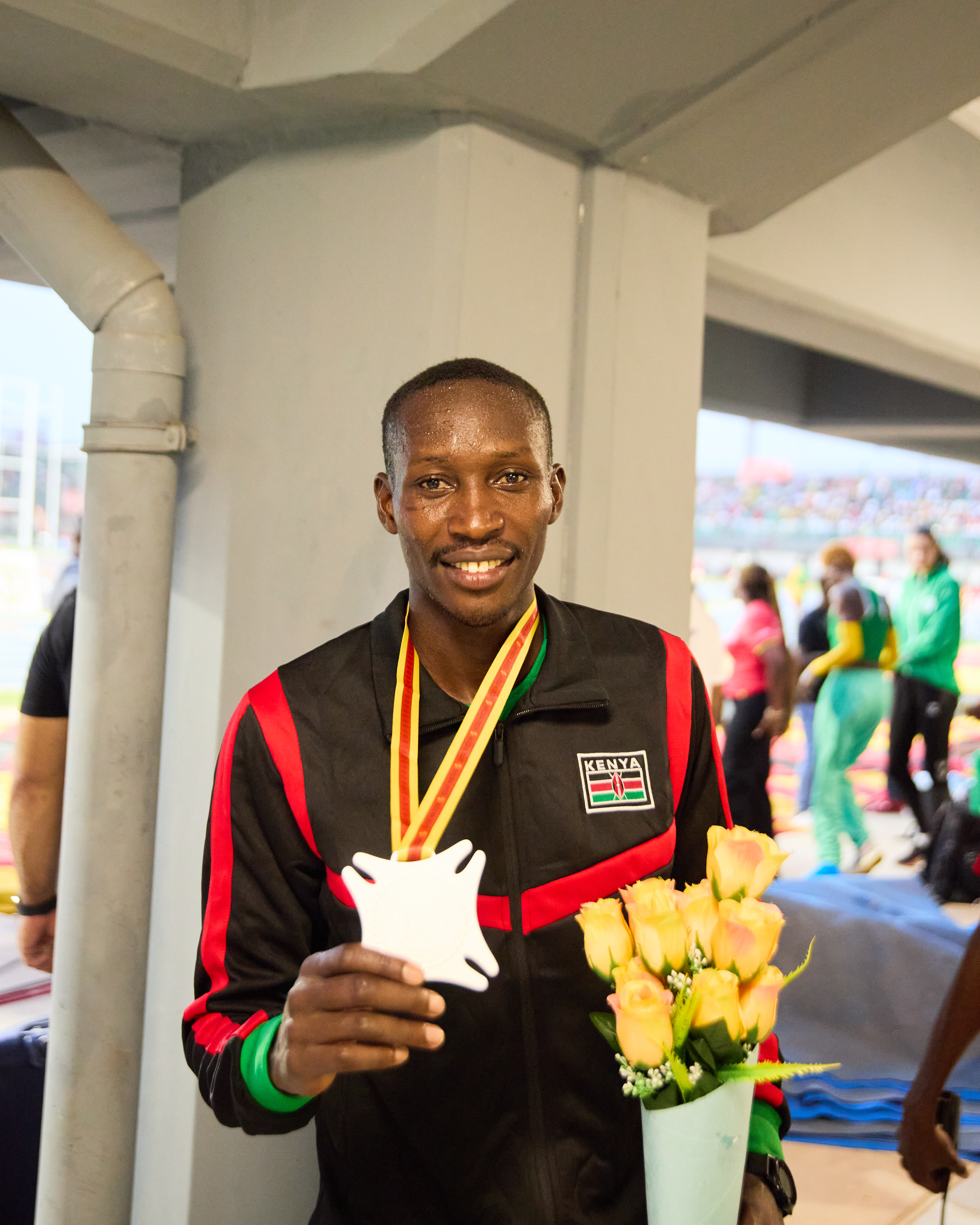
- At the 2023 African Games

Personal information
- Full name: Edwin Kipmutai Too
- Born: 14 April 1995 (age 31)

Sport
- Sport: Athletics
- Event: Decathlon

Achievements and titles
- Personal bests: Decathlon: 7305pts (2024) NR
Medal record
Men's athletics
Representing Kenya
African Games
Silver medal – second place	2023 Accra	Decathlon
African Championships
Silver medal – second place	2026 Accra	Decathlon
Bronze medal – third place	2024 Douala	Decathlon

Edwin Kipmutai Too (born 14 April 1995) is a Kenyan multi-event athlete. He won the silver medal in decathlon at the 2026 African Championships and 2023 African Games.

== Biography ==
The Kenyan national record holder in decathlon, Too won the silver medal in the decathlon at the delayed 2023 African Games, held in Accra, Ghana, in March 2024, with 7140 points. That year, he won the bronze medal in decathlon at the 2024 African Championships in Athletics in Douala, Cameroon. It was Kenya's first medal at the Championships in the discipline for 42 years.

In May 2026, he became the first Kenyan to win a silver medal in the decathlon at the African Championships at the event held in 2026 in Accra. He was selected as part of the Kenyan team for the 2026 Commonwealth Games in Glasgow, Scotland. He placed tenth in decathlon at the 2026 Commonwealth Games in Glasgow, Scotland.
