= Miné de Klerk =

South African athletics competitor

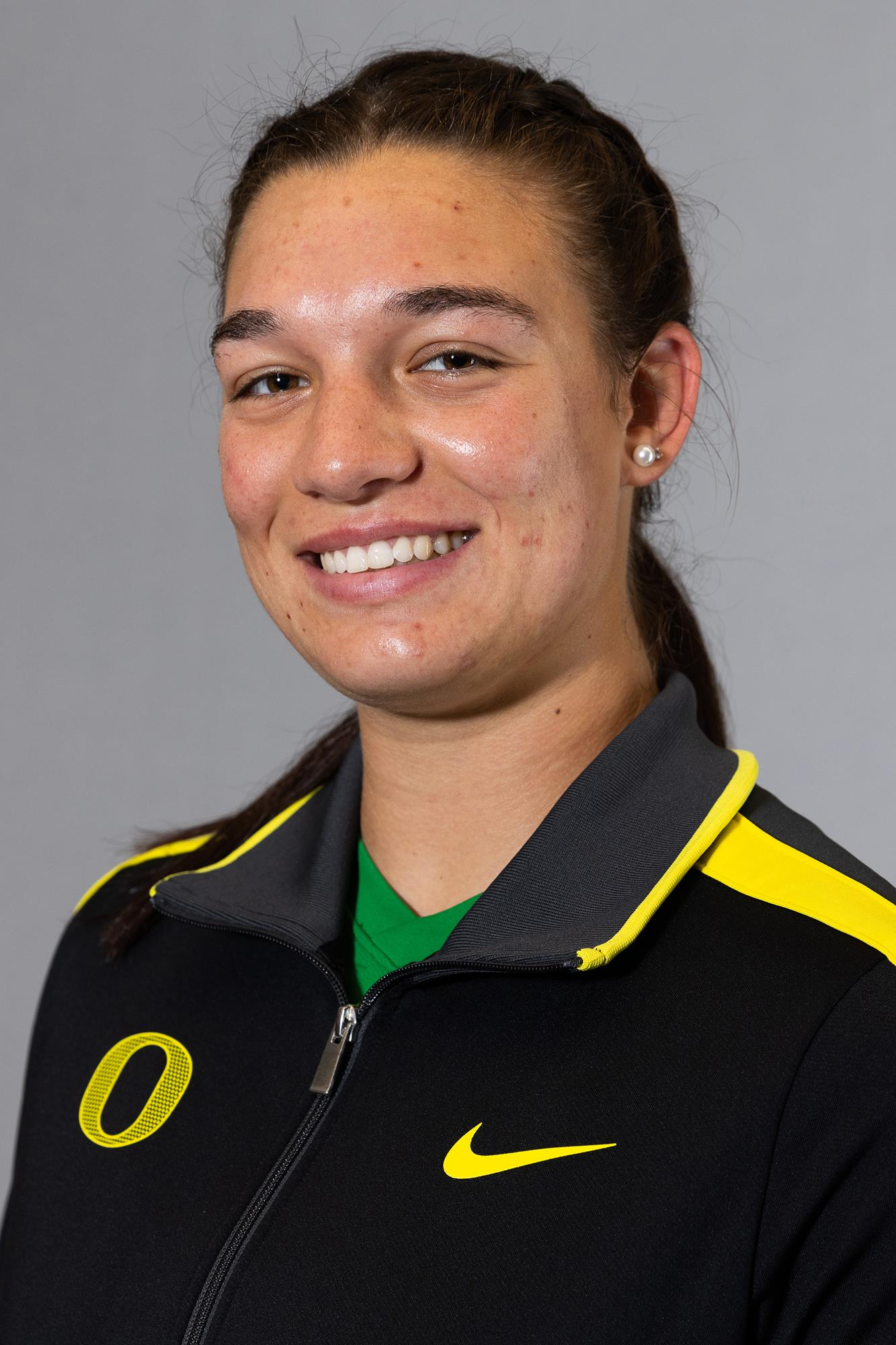

Personal information
- Nationality: South African
- Born: 30 March 2003 (age 23)

Sport
- Country: South Africa
- Sport: Athletics
- Event(s): Shot put, Discus throw

Achievements and titles
- Personal bests: Shot put: 17.55 AU20R (Potchefstroom 2021); Discus throw: 54.22 AU20R (San Diego 2022)
Medal record
Women's athletics
Representing South Africa
African Championships
Silver medal – second place	2024 Douala	Shot put
World U20 Championships
Gold medal – first place	2021 Nairobi	Shot put
Gold medal – first place	2022 Cali	Shot put
Silver medal – second place	2021 Nairobi	Discus throw
Bronze medal – third place	2022 Cali	Discus throw

Miné de Klerk (born 30 March 2003) is a South African athlete who specializes in the shot put and discus throw. She was the double medallist at both the 2021 and 2022 World Athletics Under-20 Championships. De Klerk won gold in shot put on both occasions and added medals for discus throw, taking silver in 2021 and bronze in 2022.
