= Athletics at the 2023 African Games – Men's pole vault =

Men's pole vault at the 2023 African Games
- Venue: Legon Sports Stadium
- Location: Accra, Ghana
- Dates: 21 March
- Competitors: 4 from 4 nations
- Winning height: 5.30 m

Medalists
gold medal	Medhi Amar Rouana	Algeria
silver medal	Boubacar Diallo	Mali
bronze medal	Abera Alemu	Ethiopia

The men's pole vault event at the 2023 African Games was held on 21 March 2024 in Accra, Ghana.

== Results ==
Held on 21 March

Rank	Name	Nationality	3.50	3.60	3.70	3.80	4.00	4.10	4.80	4.90	5.00	5.20	5.30	5.41	Result	Notes
1st place, gold medalist(s)	Medhi Amar Rouana	Algeria	–	–	–	–	–	–	–	–	o	xo	xo	xxx	5.30	
2nd place, silver medalist(s)	Boubacar Diallo	Mali	–	–	–	–	–	–	–	xxo	xxo	xxx			5.00	
3rd place, bronze medalist(s)	Abera Alemu	Ethiopia	o	o	o	o	xo	xxx							4.00	
	Valco Van Wyk	South Africa	–	–	–	–	–	–	xxx						NM	
