= Athletics at the 2023 African Games – Men's decathlon =

Men's decathlon at the 2023 African Games
- Venue: Legon Sports Stadium
- Location: Accra, Ghana
- Dates: 18-19 March
- Competitors: 4 from 4 nations
- Winning score: 7550 pts

Medalists
gold medal	Fredriech Pretorius	South Africa
silver medal	Edwin Kipmutai Too	Kenya
bronze medal	Dhiae Boudoumi	Algeria

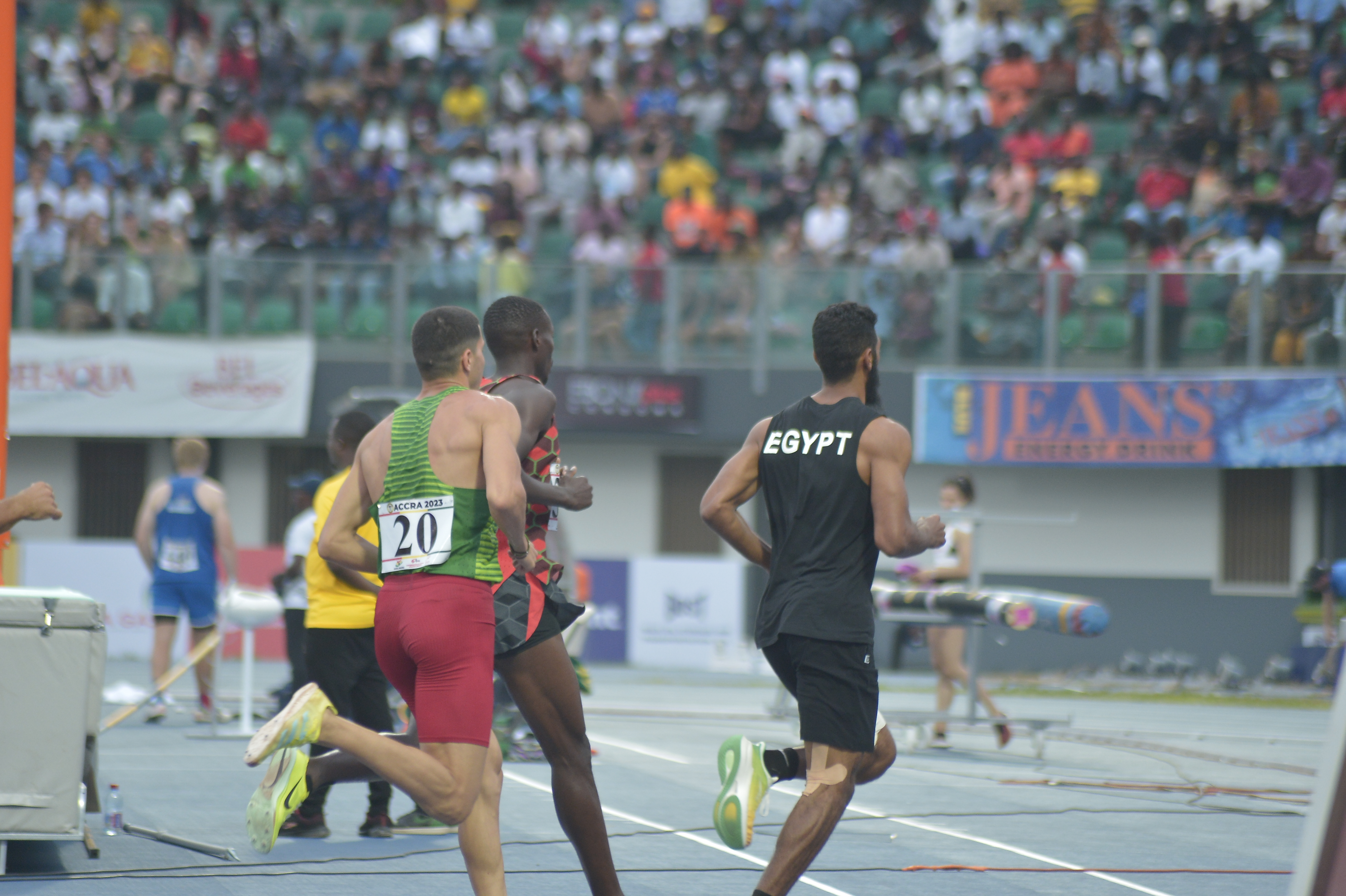
Competitors at the 2023 African Games

The men's decathlon event at the 2023 African Games was held on 18 and 19 March 2024 in Accra, Ghana.

== Results ==
=== 100 metres ===
Wind: -0.5 m/s

Rank	Lane	Name	Nationality	Time	Points	Notes
1	5	Dhiae Boudoumi	Algeria	10.87	890	
2	7	Ahmed Mahmoud Taher	Egypt	11.04	852	
3	6	Edwin Kipmutai Too	Kenya	11.10	838	
4	4	Fredriech Pretorius	South Africa	11.39	776	

=== Long jump ===
Rank	Athlete	Nationality	#1	#2	#3	Result	Points	Notes	Total
1	Edwin Kipmutai Too	Kenya	7.46	7.67	7.82	7.82	1015		1853
2	Dhiae Boudoumi	Algeria	6.98w	7.18	7.45	7.45	922		1812
3	Fredriech Pretorius	South Africa	7.44	7.35	x	7.45	920		1696
4	Ahmed Mahmoud Taher	Egypt	7.05w	–	–	7.05w	826		1678

=== Shot put ===
Rank	Athlete	Nationality	#1	#2	#3	Result	Points	Notes	Total
1	Fredriech Pretorius	South Africa	13.31	13.10	13.46	13.46	695		2391
2	Ahmed Mahmoud Taher	Egypt	11.91	12.41	13.10	13.10	673		2351
3	Edwin Kipmutai Too	Kenya	10.15	9.83	10.93	10.93	542		2395
4	Dhiae Boudoumi	Algeria	10.28	9.78	10.61	10.61	522		2334

=== High jump ===
Rank	Athlete	Nationality	1.72	1.75	1.78	1.81	1.84	1.87	1.90	1.93	1.96	1.99	2.02	2.05	Result	Points	Notes	Total
1	Dhiae Boudoumi	Algeria	–	–	o	o	o	o	o	o	xo	xxo	xxo	xxx	2.02	822		3156
2	Ahmed Mahmoud Taher	Egypt	o	–	o	–	o	–	xxo	o	o	xxx			1.96	767		3118
3	Edwin Kipmutai Too	Kenya	–	–	–	–	–	xo	o	o	xo	xxx			1.96	767		3162
4	Fredriech Pretorius	South Africa	–	–	–	xo	–	o	o	xxo	xxo	xxx			1.96	767		3158

=== 400 metres ===
Rank	Lane	Name	Nationality	Time	Points	Notes	Total
1	4	Dhiae Boudoumi	Algeria	48.20	899		4055
2	5	Edwin Kipmutai Too	Kenya	48.90	866		4028
3	6	Fredriech Pretorius	South Africa	51.95	727		3885
4	3	Ahmed Mahmoud Taher	Egypt	53.34	667		3785

=== 110 metres hurdles ===
Wind: +1.1 m/s

Rank	Lane	Name	Nationality	Time	Points	Notes	Total
1	4	Fredriech Pretorius	South Africa	14.92	859		4744
2	6	Edwin Kipmutai Too	Kenya	15.47	794		4822
3	7	Dhiae Boudoumi	Algeria	16.13	718		4773
4	5	Ahmed Mahmoud Taher	Egypt	17.14	610		4395

=== Discus throw ===
Rank	Athlete	Nationality	#1	#2	#3	Result	Points	Notes	Total
1	Fredriech Pretorius	South Africa	x	40.20	41.88	41.88	703		5447
2	Ahmed Mahmoud Taher	Egypt	x	39.04	x	39.04	645		5040
3	Edwin Kipmutai Too	Kenya	31.11	33.59	34.77	34.77	559		5381
4	Dhiae Boudoumi	Algeria	x	27.58	26.68	27.58	417		5190

=== Pole vault ===
Rank	Athlete	Nationality	3.00	3.20	3.40	3.50	3.60	3.70	3.80	3.90	4.40	4.60	Result	Points	Notes	Total
1	Fredriech Pretorius	South Africa	–	–	–	–	–	–	–	–	o	xxx	4.40	731		6178
2	Dhiae Boudoumi	Algeria	–	–	–	o	–	o	xo	xxx			3.80	562		5752
3	Edwin Kipmutai Too	Kenya	–	–	–	–	–	o	xxx				3.70	535		5916
4	Ahmed Mahmoud Taher	Egypt	o	o	xo	–	xxx						3.40	457		5497

=== Javelin throw ===
Rank	Athlete	Nationality	#1	#2	#3	Result	Points	Notes	Total
1	Fredriech Pretorius	South Africa	57.98	56.67	58.18	58.18	710		6888
2	Edwin Kipmutai Too	Kenya	46.20	48.08	x	48.08	560		6476
3	Ahmed Mahmoud Taher	Egypt	46.44	46.55	42.37	46.55	538		6035
4	Dhiae Boudoumi	Algeria	35.49	36.30	40.07	40.07	443		6195

=== 1500 metres ===
Rank	Name	Nationality	Time	Points	Notes
1	Dhiae Boudoumi	Algeria	4:29.55	748	
2	Ahmed Mahmoud Taher	Egypt	4:34.82	713	
3	Edwin Kipmutai Too	Kenya	4:42.66	664	
4	Fredriech Pretorius	South Africa	4:42.92	662	

=== Final standings ===
The highest mark recorded in each event is highlighted in yellow

Rank	Athlete	Nationality	100m	LJ	SP	HJ	400m	110m H	DT	PV	JT	1500m	Points	Notes
1st place, gold medalist(s)	Fredriech Pretorius	South Africa	11.39	7.44	13.46	1.96	51.95	14.92	41.88	4.40	58.18	4:42.92	7550	
2nd place, silver medalist(s)	Edwin Kipmutai Too	Kenya	11.10	7.82	10.93	1.96	48.90	15.47	34.77	3.70	48.08	4:42.66	7140	
3rd place, bronze medalist(s)	Dhiae Boudoumi	Algeria	10.87	7.45	10.61	2.02	48.20	16.13	27.58	3.80	40.07	4:29.55	6943	
4	Ahmed Mahmoud Taher	Egypt	11.04	7.05	13.10	1.96	53.34	17.14	39.04	3.40	46.55	4:34.82	6748	
