= Pınar Akyol =

Turkish shot putter (born 2003)

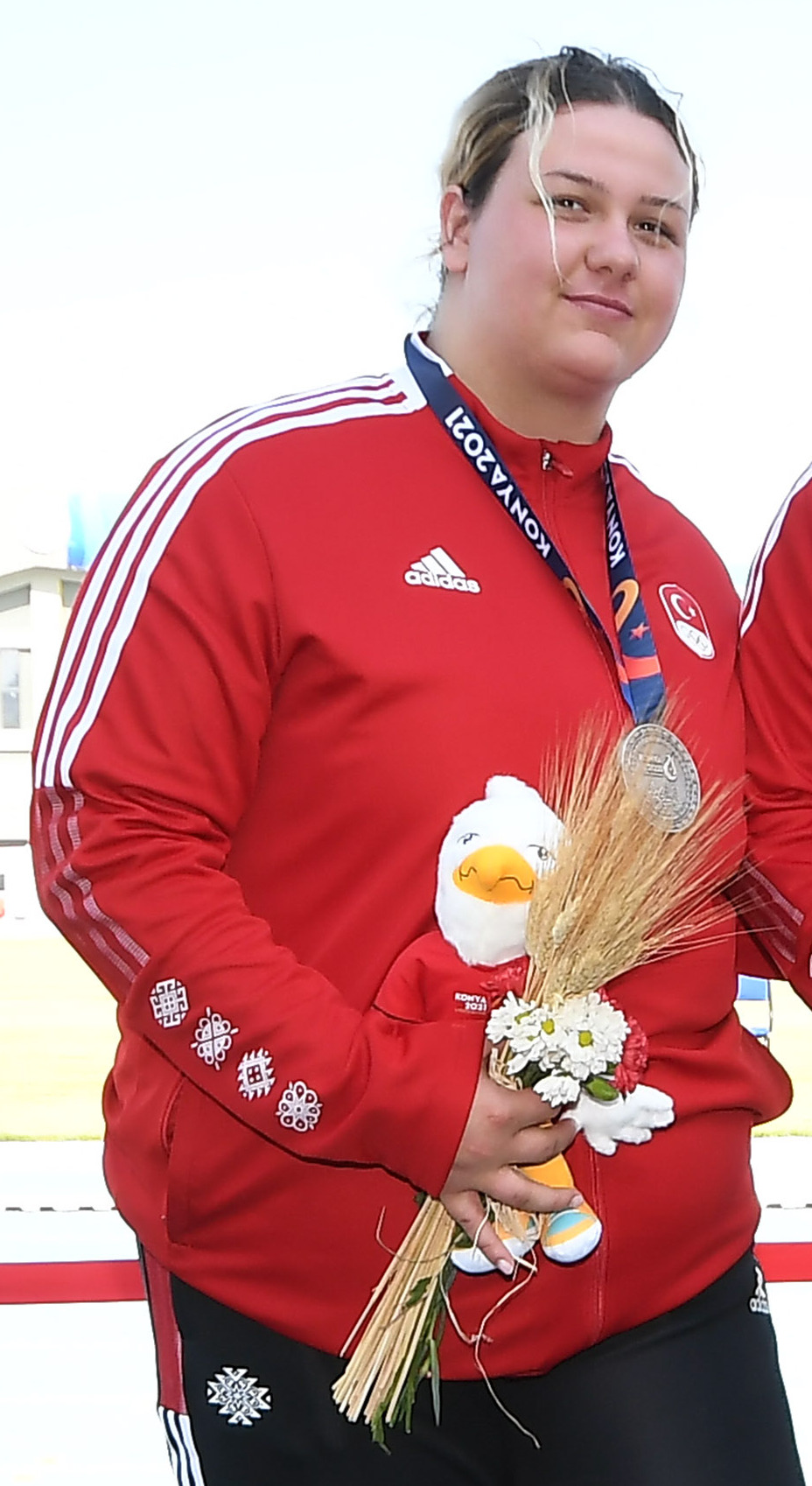
- Akyol at the 2021 Islamic Solidarity Games

Personal information
- Nationality: Turkish
- Born: October 2, 2003 (age 22) Eskişehir, Turkey

Sport
- Sport: Athletics
- Event: Shot put
- Club: Eskişehir Demirspor

Achievements and titles
- Personal bests: Outdoor: 17.65 m (2021, Split); Indoor: 17.44 m (2022, Istanbul); U20: 17.88 m (2019, Baku)
Medal record
Women's shot put
Representing Turkey
Islamic Solidarity Games
Silver medal – second place	2021 Konya	Shot put
Balkan Athletics Championships
Silver medal – second place	2021 Smederevo	Shot put
Bronze medal – third place	2024 İzmir	Shot put
World Athletics U20 Championships
Silver medal – second place	2021 Nairobi	Shot put
Silver medal – second place	2022 Cali	Shot put
European Athletics U20 Championships
Gold medal – first place	2021 Tallinn	Shot put
Silver medal – second place	2019 Borås	Shot put
European Youth Olympic Festival
Gold medal – first place	2019 Baku	Shot put

Pınar Akyol (born 2 October 2003) is a Turkish shot putter. She won gold medals at the 2019 European Youth Summer Olympic Festival, 2019 European U20 Champion Clubs Cup, 2021 European Athletics U20 Championships, 2022 European Athletics U23 Throwing Cup, and 2025 European Athletics U23 Throwing Cup.

== Career ==
Akyol won her first national U20 title in 2018. In 2019, she won gold medals at the 2019 European Youth Summer Olympic Festival and 2019 European U20 Champion Clubs Cup.

Akyol won her first continental gold medal at the 2021 European Athletics U20 Championships. Later that season, she won the silver medal in the women's shot put at the 2021 World U20 Championships.

Akyol won another global silver shot put medal in the shot put at the 2022 World U20 Championships.
